= List of British actors =

This list of notable actors from the United Kingdom includes performers in theatre, film, television, and radio.

== Born in 18th century ==
- Sophia Baddeley (1745–1786)
- Margaret Agnes Bunn (1799–1883)
- Louisa Chatterley (1797–1866)
- Maria Foote (1797?–1867)
- Henry Gattie (1774–1844)
- Charlotte Goodall (1766–1830)
- Elizabeth Hartley (1750?–1824)
- Ann Catherine Holbrook (1780–1837)
- John Philip Kemble (1757–1823)
- Maria Theresa Kemble (1774–1838) (born in Vienna, Austria)
- Henrietta Amelia Leeson (1751–1826)
- Charles Mathews (1776–1835)
- Harriet Siddons (1783–1844)
- James Prescott Warde (1792–1840)
- Mary Wells (1762–1829)
- Charles Mayne Young (1777–1856)

== Born in 1800–1829 ==
- George John Bennett (1800–1879)
- Ira Aldridge (1807—1867)
- Louisa Cranstoun Nisbett (1812–1858)
- Sarah Fairbrother (1814–1890)
- Helena Faucit (1817–1898)
- Clara Fisher (1811–1898)
- Isabella Glyn (1823–1889)
- Thomas Hailes Lacy (1809–1873)
- Laura Honey (1816–1843)
- Priscilla Horton (1818–1895)
- Frances Eleanor Jarman (1802–1873)
- Charles Kean (1811–1868) (born in Ireland)
- Ellen Kean (1805–1888)
- Mary Anne Keeley (1805–1899)
- Fanny Kemble (1809–1893)
- Harriette Deborah Lacy (1807–1874)
- Maria Ann Lovell (1803–1877)
- Mary Anne Stirling (1815–1895)
- Charlotte Vandenhoff (1816–1860)
- Mary Warner (1804–1854)

== Born in the 1830s ==
- Adelaide Calvert (1836–1921)
- Amy Fawsitt (1836–1876)
- Henry Irving (1838–1905)
- Eliza Newton (1837–1882)
- John Lawrence Toole (1830–1906)
- Charles Wyndham (1837–1919)

== Born in the 1840s ==
- Helen Barr (1840–1904)
- Eleanor Bufton (1842–1893)
- Lydia Foote (1843–1892)
- Susan Galton (1849–1918)
- Henrietta Hodson (1841–1910)
- Adelaide Neilson (1847–1880)
- Mary Frances Scott-Siddons (1844–1896)
- Edward O'Connor Terry (1844–1912)
- Ellen Terry (1847–1928)
- Kate Terry (1844–1924)
- Arthur Williams (1844–1916)

== Born in the 1850s ==
- George Alexander (1858–1918)
- Herbert Beerbohm Tree (1852–1917)
- Charles Danby (1858–1906)
- Johnston Forbes-Robertson (1853–1937)
- Charles Hawtrey (1858–1923)
- Gwynne Herbert (1859–1946)
- Marion Hood (1854–1912)
- Frederick Kerr (1858–1933)
- Lillie Langtry (1853–1929)
- Marion Terry (1853–1930)

== Born in the 1860s ==
- George Arliss (1868–1946)
- George Bellamy (1866–1944)
- Lionel Belmore (1867–1953)
- Nina Boucicault (1867–1950)
- Arthur Bourchier (1863–1927)
- Beatrice Campbell (1965–1940)
- Lyn Harding (1867–1952)
- Adeline Hayden Coffin (1862–1939) (born in Gräfrath, Germany)
- C. Hayden Coffin (1862–1935)
- Brandon Hurst (1866–1947)
- Letty Lind (1861–1923)
- A. E. Matthews (1869–1960)
- Cyril Maude (1862–1951)
- Winifred Mayo (1869–1967)
- Julia Neilson (1868–1957)
- Olga Nethersole (1867–1951)
- Edmund Payne (1863–1914)
- Courtice Pounds (1861–1927)
- Morton Selten (1860–1939)
- C. Aubrey Smith (1863–1948)
- Marie Tempest (1864–1942)
- Fred Terry (1863–1933)
- Henry Vibart (1863–1943)
- May Whitty (1865–1948)
- Haidee Wright (1867–1943)
- Huntley Wright (1868–1941)

== Born in the 1870s ==
- Henry Ainley (1879–1945)
- Marie Ault (1870–1951)
- Muriel Beaumont (1876–1957)
- Lilian Braithwaite (1873–1948)
- Constance Collier (1878–1955)
- Finlay Currie (1878–1968)
- Nigel De Brulier (1877–1948)
- Agnes Fraser (1876–1968)
- Edward Gordon Craig (1872–1966)
- Mary Garden (1874–1967)
- Evie Greene (1875–1917)
- George Grossmith Jr. (1874–1935)
- Seymour Hicks (1871–1949)
- Halliwell Hobbes (1877–1962)
- Mabel Love (1874–1953)
- Montagu Love (1877–1943)
- Maggie Moffat (1873–1943)
- Gertie Millar (1879–1952)
- Roy Redgrave (1873–1922)
- Ada Reeve (1874–1966)
- Henry Stephenson (1871–1956)
- Ellaline Terriss (1871–1971)
- Mabel Terry-Lewis (1872–1957)
- Ernest Thesiger (1879–1961)
- Henry Travers (1874–1965)
- Irene Vanbrugh (1872–1949)
- Violet Vanbrugh (1876–1942)
- H.B. Warner (1876–1958)

== Born in the 1880s ==
- Lionel Atwill (1885–1946)
- Viva Birkett (1887–1934)
- Paul Cavanagh (1888–1964)
- Charlie Chaplin (1889–1977)
- May Clark (1885–1971)
- Gladys Cooper (1888–1971)
- Donald Crisp (1882–1974)
- Evelyn D'Alroy (1881–1915)
- Zena Dare (1887–1975)
- Lily Elsie (1886–1962)
- Edith Evans (1888–1976)
- Lilian Fontaine (1886–1975)
- Lynn Fontanne (1887–1983)
- Alec Fraser (1884–1956)
- Leslie Fuller (1888–1948)
- Will Hay (1888–1949)
- Holmes Herbert (1882–1956)
- Boris Karloff (1887–1969)
- Nora Kerin (1881–1970)
- Ralph Lynn (1882–1962)
- Miles Malleson (1888–1969)
- Miles Mander (1888–1946)
- Victor McLaglen (1886–1959) (naturalised American citizen)
- Philip Merivale (1886–1946)
- Dorothy Minto (1886–1957)
- Reginald Owen (1887–1972)
- Nancy Price (1880–1970)
- Claude Rains (1889–1967)
- Gabrielle Ray (1883–1973)
- Elisabeth Risdon (1887–1958)
- Margaret Scudamore (1884–1958)
- Florence Smithson (1884–1936)
- May Leslie Stuart (1887–1956)
- Gladys Sylvani (1884–1953)
- Godfrey Tearle (1884–1953)
- Sybil Thorndike (1882–1976)
- Tom Walls (1883–1949)
- Margaret Wycherly (1881–1949)
- George Zucco (1886–1960)

== Born in the 1890s ==
- Ronald Adam (1896–1979)
- Chesney Allen (1893–1983)
- Leslie Banks (1890–1952)
- Harold Bennett (1899–1981)
- Amy Brandon Thomas (1890–1974)
- Nigel Bruce (1895–1953)
- Violet Carson (1898–1983)
- Laddie Cliff (1891–1937)
- Ivy Close (1890–1968)
- Maurice Colbourne (1894–1965)
- Ronald Colman (1891–1958)
- Harry Cording (1891–1954)
- Cicely Courtneidge (1893–1980)
- Noël Coward (1899–1973)
- Henry Daniell (1894–1963)
- Phyllis Dare (1890–1975)
- Reginald Denny (1891–1967)
- Gwen Ffrangcon-Davies (1891–1992)
- Alexander Field (Actor) (1892–1971)
- Bud Flanagan(1896–1968)
- Hermione Gingold (1897–1987)
- Cedric Hardwicke (1893–1964)
- Robertson Hare (1891–1979)
- Kathleen Harrison (1892–1995)
- Stanley Holloway (1890–1982)
- Leslie Howard (1893–1943)
- Bobby Howes (1895–1972)
- Jack Hulbert (1892–1978)
- Mervyn Johns (1899–1992)
- Lillian Kemble-Cooper (1892–1977)
- Jack Lambert (1899–1976)
- Charles Laughton (1899–1962)
- Stan Laurel (1890–1965)
- John Laurie (1897–1980)
- Flora Le Breton (1899–1951)
- Beatrice Lillie (1894–1989) (born in Toronto, Canada)
- John Loder (1898–1988)
- Stanley Lupino (1893–1942)
- Herbert Marshall (1890–1966)
- Orlando Martins (1899–1985)
- Max Miller (actor-comedian) (1894–1963)
- Clifford Mollison (1897–1986)
- Alan Mowbray (1896–1969)
- Dennis Neilson-Terry (1895–1932)
- Phyllis Neilson-Terry (1892–1977)
- Vic Oliver (1898–1964)
- Cecil Parker (1897–1971)
- Basil Rathbone (1892–1967)
- Philip Ray (1898-1978)
- Kynaston Reeves (1893–1971)
- Arnold Ridley (1896–1984)
- Margaret Rutherford (1892–1972)
- Olive Sloane (1896–1963)
- Reginald Tate (1896–1955)
- Barbara Tennant (1892–1982)
- Heather Thatcher (1896–1987)
- Arthur Treacher (1894–1975) (naturalised American citizen)
- Norma Varden (1898–1989)
- Jack Warner (1895–1981)

== Born in the 1900s ==
- Marguerite Allan (1905–1994) (born in Saint Petersburg, Russia)
- Peggy Ashcroft (1907–1991)
- Arthur Askey (1900–1982)
- Angela Baddeley (1904–1976)
- Hermione Baddeley (1906–1986)
- Patrick Barr (1908–1985) (born in Akola, India)
- Ballard Berkeley (1904–1988)
- Leslie Bradley (1907–1974)
- Arthur Brough (1905–1978)
- Jane Carr (1909–1957)
- Edward Chapman (1901–1977)
- Sylvia Coleridge (1909–1986)
- Tom Conway (1904–1967) (born in St. Petersburg, Russia)
- Beryl Cooke (1906–2001)
- Roland Culver (1900–1984)
- Brenda Dean Paul (1907–1959)
- Maurice Denham (1909–2002)
- Robert Donat (1905–1958)
- Evelyn Dove (1902–1987)
- Angela du Maurier (1904–2002)
- Leslie Dwyer (1906–1986)
- Valentine Dyall (1908–1985)
- Jean Forbes-Robertson (1905–1962)
- Leslie French (1904–1999)
- Greer Garson (1904–1996) (naturalised American citizen)
- Leo Genn (1905–1978)
- John Gielgud (1904–2000)
- Cary Grant (1904–1986) (naturalised American citizen)
- Rex Harrison (1908–1990)
- William Hartnell (1908–1975)
- Joan Hickson (1906–1998)
- Bob Hope (1903–2003) (naturalised American citizen)
- John Houseman (1902–1988) (British and American citizenship)
- Benita Hume (1906–1967)
- Raymond Huntley (1904-1990)
- Wilfrid Hyde-White (1903–1991)
- Freda Jackson (1907–1990)
- Ursula Jeans (1906–1973)
- Celia Johnson (1908–1982)
- Griffith Jones (1909–2007)
- James Robertson Justice (1907–1975)
- Moultrie Kelsall (1904–1980)
- Joan Kemp-Welch (1906–1999)
- Esmond Knight (1906–1987)
- Bernard Lee (1908–1981)
- Beatrix Lehmann (1903–1979)
- Queenie Leonard (1905–2002)
- Roger Livesey (1906–1976)
- Charles Lloyd-Pack (1902–1983)
- James Mason (1909–1984)
- Guy Middleton (1907–1973)
- John Mills (1908–2005)
- Robert Morley (1908–1992)
- Clive Morton (1904–1975)
- Alan Napier (1903–1988)
- Anna Neagle (1904–1986)
- Robert Newton (1905–1956)
- Anthony Nicholls (1902–1977)
- Dandy Nichols (1907–1986)
- Mary Odette (1901–1987) (born in Dieppe, France)
- Laurence Olivier (1907–1989)
- J. Pat O'Malley (1904–1985)
- Michael Redgrave (1908–1985)
- Trevor Reid (1908–1965)
- Michael Rennie (1909–1971) (naturalised American citizen)
- Ralph Richardson (1902–1983)
- John Robinson (1908–1979)
- Flora Robson (1902–1984)
- Oriel Ross (1907–1994)
- George Sanders (1906–1972) (born in Saint Petersburg, Russia)
- Eileen Sharp (1900–1958)
- Sebastian Shaw (1905–1994)
- Ida Shepley (1908–1975)
- Alastair Sim (1900–1976)
- Francis L. Sullivan (1903–1956)
- Nora Swinburne (1902–2000)
- Jessica Tandy (1909–1994) (naturalised American citizen)
- Ralph Truman (1900–1977)
- Ronald Ward (1901–1978)
- Naunton Wayne (1901–1970)
- Alan Webb (1906–1982)
- Lockwood West (1905–1989)
- Eileen Winterton (1903–2004)
- Donald Wolfit (1902–1968)
- Diana Wynyard (1906–1964)

== Born in the 1910s ==
- Harry Andrews (1911–1989)
- Bernard Archard (1916–2008)
- Peter Arne (1918–1983)
- Renee Asherson (1915–2014)
- Alfie Bass (1916–1987)
- Peggy Batchelor (1916–2020)
- Sam Beazley (1916–2017)
- Martin Benson (1918–2010)
- Pamela Brown (1917–1975)
- Brenda Bruce (1919–1996)
- Hugh Burden (1913–1985)
- Alfred Burke (1918–2011)
- Edward Burnham (1916–2015)
- Peter Butterworth (1915–1979)
- Sebastian Cabot (1918–1977)
- Phyllis Calvert (1915–2002)
- Earl Cameron (1917–2020)
- Eric Christmas (1916–2000)
- Diana Churchill (1913–1994)
- Alec Clunes (1912–1970)
- Bryan Coleman (1911–2005)
- Noel Coleman (1919–2007)
- Peter Copley (1915–2008)
- Peter Cushing (1913–1994)
- Anthony Dawson (1916–1992)
- Roger Delgado (1918–1973)
- Michael Denison (1915–1998)
- Robert Dorning (1913–1989)
- Hamilton Dyce (1912–1972)
- Arthur English (1919–1995)
- Peter Finch (1916–1977)
- Robert Flemyng (1912–1995)
- Joan Fontaine (1917–2013) (naturalised American citizen; born in Tokyo, Japan)
- Gretchen Franklin (1911–2005)
- Michael Goodliffe (1914–1976)
- Harold Goodwin (1917–2004)
- Marius Goring (1912–1998)
- Michael Gough (1916–2011) (born in Kuala Lumpur, Malaysia)
- Dulcie Gray (1915–2011)
- John Gregson (1919–1975)
- Joyce Grenfell (1910–1979)
- Lucy Griffiths (1919–1982)
- Alec Guinness (1914–2000)
- Jimmy Hanley (1918–1970)
- Olivia de Havilland (1916–2020) (naturalised American citizen; born in Tokyo, Japan)
- Jack Hawkins (1910–1973)
- Charles Hawtrey (1914–1988)
- Pauline Henriques (1914–1998) (born in Kingston, Jamaica)
- Wendy Hiller (1912–2003)
- Thora Hird (1911–2003)
- Michael Hordern (1911–1995)
- Trevor Howard (1913–1988)
- Betty Huntley-Wright (1911–1993)
- Richard Hurndall (1910–1984)
- Sid James (1913–1976)
- Edward Jewesbury (1917–2001)
- Margo Johns (1919–2009)
- Emrys Jones (1915–1972)
- Geoffrey Keen (1916–2005)
- Rachel Kempson (1910–2003)
- Sam Kydd (1915–1982)
- Vivien Leigh (1913–1967) (born in Darjeeling, India)
- John Le Mesurier (1912–1983)
- Desmond Llewelyn (1914–1999)
- Margaret Lockwood (1916–1990)
- Arthur Lowe (1915–1982)
- Marne Maitland (1914–1991) (born in Calcutta, India)
- Margery Mason (1913–2014)
- Frank Middlemass (1919–2006)
- Kenneth More (1914–1982)
- Peggy Mount (1915–2001)
- Lionel Murton (1915–2006)
- David Niven (1910–1983)
- Merle Oberon (1911–1979) (born in Mumbai, India)
- Nigel Patrick (1912–1981)
- Laurence Payne (1919–2009)
- Lennard Pearce (1915–1984)
- Jon Pertwee (1919–1996)
- Donald Pleasence (1919–1995)
- Olaf Pooley (1914–2015)
- Dennis Price (1915–1973)
- Anthony Quayle (1913–1989)
- Luise Rainer (1910–2014) (born in Düsseldorf, Germany)
- Joyce Redman (1918–2012)
- Beryl Reid (1919–1996)
- Michael Ripper (1913–2000)
- Paul Rogers (1917–2013)
- Fanny Rowe (1913–1988)
- Joan Sanderson (1912–1992)
- Zohra Sehgal (1912–2014)
- Frank Singuineau (1913–1992)
- June Spencer (1919–2024)
- Nigel Stock (1919–1986)
- Sydney Tafler (1916–1979)
- Richard Todd (1919–2009)
- Terry-Thomas (1911–1990)
- David Tomlinson (1917–2000)
- Geoffrey Toone (1910–2005)
- Reg Varney (1916–2008)
- Kay Walsh (1911–2005)
- Thorley Walters (1913–1991)
- Jack Watson (1915–1999)
- Richard Wattis (1912–1975)
- Eileen Way (1911–1994)
- Anna Wing (1914–2013)
- Norman Wisdom (1915–2010)
- Googie Withers (1917–2011)
- John Witty (1915–1990)

== Born in the 1920s ==
=== A–M ===
- Joss Ackland (1928–2023)
- Michael Aldridge (1920–1994)
- Jean Alexander (1926–2016)
- Terence Alexander (1923–2009)
- Patrick Allen (1927–2006)
- Nicholas Amer (1923–2019)
- Daphne Anderson (1922–2013)
- Robert Arden (1922–2004) (naturalised American citizen)
- Richard Attenborough (1923–2014)
- Alan Badel (1923–1982)
- Jill Balcon (1925–2009)
- Sheila Ballantine (1928–2026)
- Ian Bannen (1928–1999)
- Ronnie Barker (1929–2005)
- Peter Barkworth (1929–2006)
- Thelma Barlow (born 1929)
- John Barron (1920–2004)
- Geoffrey Bayldon (1924–2017)
- James Beck (1929–1973)
- Tony Beckley (1929–1980)
- Michael Beint (1925–2026)
- Jill Bennett (1926–1990)
- John Bennett (1928–2005)
- Thane Bettany (1929–2015) (born in Sarawak)
- Honor Blackman (1925–2020)
- Dirk Bogarde (1921–1999)
- Peter Brace (1924–2018)
- Tony Britton (1924–2019)
- Lyndon Brook (1926–2004)
- Faith Brook (1922–2012)
- June Brown (1927–2022)
- Robert Brown (1921–2003)
- Dora Bryan (1923–2014)
- Peter Burton (1921–1989)
- Richard Burton (1925–1984)
- Sheila Burrell (1922–2011)
- Kathleen Byron (1921–2009)
- John Carlin (1929–2017)
- Ian Carmichael (1920–2010)
- Peter Cellier (born 1928)
- Geoffrey Chater (1921–2021)
- Tom Chatto (1920–1982)
- George Cole (1925–2015)
- Bonar Colleano (1924–1958)
- Nicholas Courtney (1929–2011)
- Michael Craig (born 1929)
- Bernard Cribbins (1928–2022)
- Graham Crowden (1922–2010)
- Peggy Cummins (1925–2017)
- Paul Daneman (1925–2001)
- Paul Danquah (1925–2015)
- Nigel Davenport (1928–2013)
- Jeffery Dench (1928–2014)
- Edna Doré (1921–2014)
- Roy Dotrice (1923–2017)
- Jack Douglas (1927–2008)
- Carl Duering (1923–2018) (born in Germany)
- Clive Dunn (1920–2012)
- Paul Eddington (1927–1995)
- Mark Eden (1928–2021)
- Denholm Elliott (1922–1992)
- Andrew Faulds (1923–2000)
- Fenella Fielding (1927–2018)
- Frank Finlay (1926–2016)
- Gerald Flood (1927–1989)
- Bryan Forbes (1926–2013)
- Barry Foster (1927–2002)
- Bernard Fox (1927–2016)
- William Franklyn (1925–2006)
- Beulah Garrick (born 1921)
- David Graham (1925–2024)
- Charles Gray (1928–2000)
- Elspet Gray (1929–2013)
- Nigel Green (1924–1972) (born in Pretoria, South Africa)
- Joan Greenwood (1921–1987)
- James Grout (1927–2012)
- Robert Hardy (1925–2017)
- Gerald Harper (1929–2025)
- Rosemary Harris (born 1927) (naturalised American citizen)
- Nigel Hawthorne (1929–2001)
- Damaris Hayman (1929–2021)
- Jack Hedley (1929–2021)
- Audrey Hepburn (1929–1993) (born in Ixelles, Belgium)
- Bernard Hepton (1925–2018)
- Barbara Hicks (1924–2013)
- Jacqueline Hill (1929–1993)
- John Horsley (1920–2014)
- Donald Houston (1923–1991)
- Glyn Houston (1925–2019)
- Peter Hughes (1922–2019)
- Russell Hunter (1925–2004)
- Gordon Jackson (1923–1990)
- Hattie Jacques (1922–1980)
- Saeed Jaffrey (1929–2015)
- Emrys James (1928–1989)
- Colin Jeavons (born 1929)
- Peter Jeffrey (1929–1999)
- Lionel Jeffries (1926–2010)
- Errol John (1924–1988)
- Margaret John (1926–2011)
- Glynis Johns (1923–2024)
- Freddie Jones (1927–2019)
- Peter Jones (1920–2000)
- Patrick Jordan (1923–2020)
- Yootha Joyce (1927–1980)
- Miriam Karlin (1925–2011)
- Maurice Kaufmann (1927–1997)
- Bernard Kay (1928–2014)
- Andrew Keir (1926–1997)
- Elizabeth Kelly (1921–2025)
- Deborah Kerr (1921–2007)
- Patricia Kirkwood (1921–2007)
- Danny La Rue (1927–2009)
- Cleo Laine (1927–2025)
- Harry Landis (1926–2022)
- Angela Lansbury (1925–2022) (naturalised American citizen)
- Philip Latham (1929–2020)
- Peter Lawford (1923–1984)
- Christopher Lee (1922–2015)
- Ronald Leigh-Hunt (1920–2005)
- Margaret Leighton (1922–1976)
- Barry Letts (1925–2009)
- Stephen Lewis (1926–2015)
- Raymond Llewellyn (1928–2026)
- David Lodge (1921–2003)
- Barbara Lott (1920–2002)
- Fulton Mackay (1922–1987)
- Patrick Macnee (1922–2015)
- Victor Maddern (1928–1993)
- Carol Marsh (1926–2010)
- Reginald Marsh (1926–2001)
- Sheila Mathews (1927–2026)
- Francis Matthews (1927–2014)
- James Maxwell (1929–1995)
- Bill Maynard (1928–2018)
- Alec McCowen (1925–2017)
- Buster Merryfield (1920–1999)
- Peter Miles (1928–2018)
- Warren Mitchell (1926–2015)
- Ron Moody (1924–2015)
- Roger Moore (1927–2017)
- Aubrey Morris (1926–2015)
- Barbara Murray (1929–2014)

=== N–Z ===
- John Nettleton (1929–2023)
- John Neville (1925–2011)
- Geoffrey Palmer (1927–2020)
- Nicholas Parsons (1923–2020)
- John Paul (1921–1995)
- Muriel Pavlow (1921–2019)
- Donald Pelmear (1924–2025)
- Bill Pertwee (1926–2013)
- Conrad Phillips (1925–2016)
- Dorothea Phillips (born 1928)
- Leslie Phillips (1924–2022)
- Joan Plowright (1929–2025)
- Eric Porter (1928–1995)
- Peter Pratt (1923–1995)
- Pearl Prescod (1920–1966) (born in Tobago)
- John Quarmby (1929–2019)
- Oscar Quitak (1926–2023)
- Moira Redmond (1928–2006)
- Aubrey Richards (1920–2000)
- Robert Rietti (1923–2015)
- John Ringham (1928–2008)
- Brian Rix (1924–2016)
- Rachel Roberts (1927–1980) (dual British and American citizenship)
- George Rose (1920–1988)
- Norman Rossington (1928–1999)
- Leonard Rossiter (1926–1984)
- Patricia Routledge (1929–2025)
- William Russell (1924–2024)
- Peter Sallis (1921–2017)
- Paul Scofield (1922–2008)
- Terry Scott (1927–1994)
- Elizabeth Sellars (1921–2019)
- Peter Sellers (1925–1980)
- Renu Setna (born 1929) (born in Pakistan during British rule)
- Robert Shaw (1927–1978)
- Susan Shaw (1929–1978)
- Dinah Sheridan (1920–2012)
- Carmen Silvera (1922–2002)
- Sheila Sim (1922–2016)
- Jean Simmons (1929–2010)
- Donald Sinden (1923–2014)
- Daphne Slater (1928–2012)
- Liz Smith (1921–2016)
- Elizabeth Spriggs (1929–2008)
- Anthony Steel (1920–2001)
- Roy Stewart (1925–2008) (born in Jamaica)
- John Stone (1924–2007)
- Philip Stone (1924–2003)
- Kevin Stoney (1921–2008)
- Mollie Sugden (1922–2009)
- Eric Sykes (1923–2012)
- Pauline Tennant (1927–2008)
- Frank Thornton (1921–2013)
- Bill Travers (1922–1994)
- Frederick Treves (1925–2012)
- Patrick Troughton (1920–1987)
- Peter Ustinov (1921–2004)
- Peter Vaughan (1923–2016)
- Jack Watling (1923–2001)
- Moray Watson (1928–2017)
- Laurie Webb (1924–2026)
- Peter Welch (1922–1984)
- June Whitfield (1925–2018)
- Paul Whitsun-Jones (1923–1974)
- Brian Wilde (1927–2008)
- Kenneth Williams (1926–1988)
- Douglas Wilmer (1920–2016)
- Frank Windsor (1928–2020)
- John Woodnutt (1924–2006)
- John Woodvine (1929–2025)
- Peter Wyngarde (c. 1926 or 1927–2018) (born in Marseille, France or Singapour)
- Arnold Yarrow (1920–2024)

== Born in the 1930s ==
=== A–M ===
- Anthony Ainley (1932–2004)
- Ronald Allen (1930–1991)
- Julie Andrews (born 1935)
- Eileen Atkins (born 1934)
- Allister Bain (1932–2026)
- George Baker (1931–2011)
- Kenny Baker (1934–2016)
- Tom Baker (born 1934)
- Trevor Bannister (1934–2011)
- David Baron (born 1933)
- Lynda Baron (1939–2022)
- Keith Barron (1934–2017)
- Alan Bates (1934–2003)
- David Battley (1935–2003)
- Trevor Baxter (1932–2017)
- Kathryn Beaumont (born 1937)
- Brian Bedford (1935–2016) (naturalised American citizen)
- Steven Berkoff (born 1937)
- Rodney Bewes (1937–2017)
- Colin Blakely (1930–1987)
- Brian Blessed (born 1936)
- Claire Bloom (born 1931)
- James Bolam (born 1935)
- Bette Bourne (1939–2024)
- Peter Bowles (1936–2022)
- Roy Boyd (1938–2024)
- Stephen Boyd (1931–1977)
- Bernard Bresslaw (1934–1993)
- Jeremy Brett (1933–1995)
- Yvonne Brewster (1938–2025)
- Roger Brierley (1935–2005)
- Richard Briers (1934–2013)
- Eleanor Bron (born 1938)
- Ray Brooks (1939–2025)
- David Burke (1934–2026)
- Mark Burns (1936–2007)
- Patsy Byrne (1933–2014)
- Michael Caine (born 1933)
- Timothy Carlton (born 1939)
- John Cater (1932–2009)
- Tony Caunter (1937–2025)
- Tony Church (1930–2008)
- John Cleese (born 1939)
- Maurice Colbourne (1939–1989)
- Joan Collins (born 1933)
- Paul Collins (born 1937)
- Neil Connery (1938–2021)
- Sean Connery (1930–2020)
- Peter Cook (1937–1995)
- Kenneth Cope (1931–2024)
- Ronnie Corbett (1930–2016)
- Adrienne Corri (1931–2016)
- James Cossins (1933–1997)
- Nicolas Coster (1933–2023)
- Tom Courtenay (born 1937)
- Wendy Craig (born 1934)
- Anna Cropper (1938–2007)
- Annette Crosbie (born 1934)
- Frances Cuka (1936–2020)
- Roland Curram (1932–2025)
- Jill Curzon (1938–2026)
- Iain Cuthbertson (1930–2009)
- David Daker (1935–2026)
- Jim Dale (born 1935)
- Ann Davies (1934–2022)
- Oliver Ford Davies (born 1939)
- Richard Dawson (1932–2012) (naturalised American citizen)
- Judi Dench (born 1934)
- Eileen Derbyshire (born 1931)
- Edward de Souza (born 1932)
- Diana Dors (1931–1984)
- Shirley Eaton (born 1937)
- Glynn Edwards (1931–2018)
- Samantha Eggar (1939–2025)
- Shirley Anne Field (1936–2023)
- Albert Finney (1936–2019)
- Derek Fowlds (1937–2020)
- Edward Fox (born 1937)
- James Fox (born 1939)
- Richard Franklin (1936–2023)
- Peter Fraser (born 1932/1933)
- Jill Gascoine (1937–2020)
- William Gaunt (born 1937)
- Tom Georgeson (1936–2026)
- Peter Gilmore (1931–2013) (born in Leipzig, Germany)
- Brian Glover (1934–1997)
- Julian Glover (born 1935)
- Kenneth Haigh (1931–2018)
- Patricia Haines (1932–1977)
- Mona Hammond (1935–2022)
- Roger Hammond (1936–2012)
- Susan Hampshire (born 1937)
- Sheila Hancock (born 1933)
- Edward Hardwicke (1932–2011)
- Noel Harrison (1934–2013)
- Malcolm Hebden (born 1939)
- Don Henderson (1931–1997)
- Janet Henfrey (born 1935)
- Anne Heywood (1931–2023)
- Ram John Holder (born 1934)
- Ian Holm (1931–2020)
- Anthony Hopkins (born 1937) (naturalised American citizen)
- Penelope Horner (born 1939)
- Bernard Horsfall (1930–2013)
- Sally Ann Howes (1930–2021)
- John Inman (1935–2007)
- Jill Ireland (1936–1990)
- Barry Jackson (1938–2013)
- Glenda Jackson (1936–2023)
- Derek Jacobi (born 1938)
- Michael Jayston (1935–2024)
- Barbara Jefford (1930–2020)
- Edward Judd (1932–2009)
- Anna Kashfi (1934–2015)
- Barbara Knox (born 1933)
- Ronald Lacey (1935–1991)
- Dinsdale Landen (1932–2003)
- Andria Lawrence (1936–2025)
- Phyllida Law (1932–2026)
- Rosemary Leach (1935–2017)
- Angus Lennie (1930–2014)
- Bernard Lloyd (1934–2018)
- Kenny Lynch (1938–2019)
- Ann Lynn (1933–2020)
- Philip Madoc (1934–2012)
- Louis Mahoney (1938–2020) (born in the Gambia)
- Jean Marsh (1934–2025)
- Derek Martin (1933–2026)
- Anna Massey (1937–2011)
- Jamila Massey (born 1934) (born in British India)
- David McCallum (1933–2023) (naturalised American citizen)
- Geraldine McEwan (1932–2015)
- Stanley McGeagh (1936–2025)
- Ian McKellen (born 1939)
- Virginia McKenna (born 1931)
- Michael McStay (1933–2025)
- Stanley Meadows (1931–2025)
- Ann Mitchell (born 1939)
- Donald Moffat (1930–2018)
- Dudley Moore (1935–2002)
- Garfield Morgan (1931–2009)
- Patrick Mower (born 1938)
- Brian Murphy (1932–2025)

=== N–Z ===
- Sally Nesbitt (born 1938)
- Anthony Newley (1931–1999)
- Jonathan Newth (born 1939)
- Geraldine Newman (born 1934)
- Nanette Newman (born 1934)
- John Nolan (1938–2026)
- John Normington (1937–2007)
- Simon Oates (1932–2009)
- Kate O'Mara (1939–2014)
- Geraldine Moffat (born 1939)
- Peter O'Toole (1932–2013)
- Judy Parfitt (born 1935)
- Dorothy Paul (born 1937)
- Siân Phillips (born 1933)
- Donald Pickering (1933–2009)
- Christina Pickles (born 1935)
- Vivian Pickles (born 1931)
- Ingrid Pitt (1937–2010)
- Mike Pratt (1931–1976)
- Tim Preece (born 1938)
- David Prowse (1935–2020)
- Peter Purves (born 1939)
- Anna Quayle (1932–2019)
- Corin Redgrave (1939–2010)
- Vanessa Redgrave (born 1937)
- Oliver Reed (1938–1999)
- Anne Reid (born 1935)
- Ian Richardson (1934–2007)
- John Richardson (1934–2021)
- Terence Rigby (1937–2007)
- Diana Rigg (1938–2020)
- William Roache (born 1932)
- Michael Robbins (1930–1992)
- Anton Rodgers (1933–2007)
- Patsy Rowlands (1931–2005)
- David Ryall (1935–2014)
- Andrew Sachs (1930–2016)
- Nadim Sawalha (born 1933)
- Prunella Scales (1932–2025)
- Leslie Schofield (born 1938)
- Janette Scott (born 1938)
- Michael Sheard (1938–2005)
- Barbara Shelley (1932–2021)
- Carole Shelley (1939–2018)
- Derrick Sherwin (1936–2018)
- Joan Sims (1930–2001)
- Roy Skelton (1931–2011)
- Jack Smethurst (1932–2022)
- Maggie Smith (1934–2024)
- Nicholas Smith (1934–2015)
- Anne Stallybrass (1938–2021)
- Terence Stamp (1938–2025)
- Tommy Steele (born 1936)
- Robert Stephens (1931–1995)
- John Stride (1936–2018)
- Veronica Strong (born 1938)
- Una Stubbs (1937–2021)
- Janet Suzman (born 1939)
- Clive Swift (1936–2019)
- Sylvia Syms (1934–2023)
- Elizabeth Taylor (1932–2011) (dual citizenship; born to American parents living in England)
- Josephine Tewson (1931–2022)
- Angela Thorne (1939–2023)
- Malcolm Tierney (1938–2014)
- Ricky Tomlinson (born 1939)
- Bill Treacher (1930–2022)
- Bridget Turner (1939–2014)
- Margaret Tyzack (1931–2011)
- Anthony Valentine (1939–2015)
- Wanda Ventham (born 1935)
- James Villiers (1933–1998)
- Rudolph Walker (born 1939)
- Bill Wallis (1936–2013)
- Shani Wallis (born 1933) (naturalised American citizen)
- Hugh Walters (1939–2015)
- Jan Waters (born 1937)
- Anita West (born 1935)
- Timothy West (1934–2024)
- Paxton Whitehead (1937–2023)
- Billie Whitelaw (1932–2014)
- Jeffry Wickham (1933–2014)
- Frank Williams (1931–2022)
- Michael Williams (1935–2001)
- Wendy Williams (1934–2019)
- Nicol Williamson (1936–2011)
- Richard Wilson (born 1936)
- Barbara Windsor (1937–2020)
- Michael Wisher (1935–1995)
- John Wood (1930–2011)
- Peter Woodthorpe (1931–2004)
- Edward Woodward (1930–2009)
- Gabriel Woolf (born 1932)
- Dana Wynter (1931–2011) (born in Berlin, Germany)
- Susannah York (1939–2011)
- Barbara Young (1931–2023)

== Born in the 1940s ==
=== A–M ===
- Maria Aitken (born 1945)
- John Alderton (born 1940)
- Anthony Andrews (born 1948)
- Francesca Annis (born 1945)
- Alun Armstrong (born 1946)
- Sean Arnold (1941–2020)
- Jane Asher (born 1946)
- Nina Baden-Semper (born 1945)
- Colin Baker (born 1943)
- Desmond Barrit (1944–2026)
- Stephanie Beacham (born 1947)
- Richard Beckinsale (1947–1979)
- Geoffrey Beevers (born 1941)
- Floella Benjamin (born 1949)
- Mike Berry (1942–2025)
- Martine Beswick (born 1941) (born in Port Antonio, Jamaica)
- Christopher Biggins (born 1948)
- John Bindon (1943–1993)
- Jane Birkin (1946–2023)
- Jacqueline Bisset (born 1944)
- Cilla Black (1943–2015)
- Isobel Black (born 1942)
- Isla Blair (born 1944)
- Brenda Blethyn (born 1946)
- David Bowie (1947–2016)
- David Bradley (born 1942)
- Nick Brimble (born 1944)
- Jim Broadbent (born 1949)
- Paul Brooke (born 1944)
- Jeremy Bulloch (1945–2020)
- Geoffrey Burridge (1948–1987)
- Peter Burroughs (born 1947)
- David Calder (born 1946)
- Simon Callow (born 1949)
- Ken Campbell (1941–2008)
- Jim Carter (born 1948)
- Anna Carteret (born 1942) (born in Bangalore, India)
- Christopher Cazenove (1943–2010)
- Julian Chagrin (born 1940)
- John Challis (1942–2021)
- Geraldine Chaplin (born 1944) (born in Santa Monica, California, United States)
- Graham Chapman (1941–1989)
- Ian Charleson (1949–1990)
- Julie Christie (born 1940) (born in Chabua, India)
- Warren Clarke (1947–2014)
- Stephanie Cole (1941–2026)
- David Collings (1940–2020)
- Lewis Collins (1946–2013)
- Pauline Collins (1940–2025)
- Billy Connolly (born 1942)
- Tom Conti (born 1941)
- Ron Cook (born 1948)
- Charlotte Cornwell (1949–2021)
- Judy Cornwell (born 1940)
- James Cosmo (born 1947)
- Brian Cox (born 1946)
- Kenneth Cranham (born 1944)
- Michael Crawford (born 1942)
- Ben Cross (1947–2020)
- Tim Curry (1946–2026)
- Timothy Dalton (born 1946)
- Roger Daltrey (born 1944)
- Charles Dance (born 1946)
- Anthony Daniels (born 1946)
- Anita Dobson (born 1949)
- Michele Dotrice (born 1948)
- Gabrielle Drake (born 1944)
- Richard Durden (born 1944)
- Peter Egan (born 1946)
- Marianne Faithfull (1946–2025)
- Suzan Farmer (1942–2017)
- Sally Faulkner (born 1946)
- Julian Fellowes (born 1949)
- Pam Ferris (born 1948) (born in Hanover, West Germany)
- Barbara Flynn (born 1948)
- Carole Ann Ford (born 1940)
- Clive Francis (born 1946)
- Jan Francis (born 1947)
- Hugh Fraser (born 1945)
- Paul Freeman (born 1943)
- Christopher Gable (1940–1998)
- Michael Gambon (1940–2023)
- Judy Geeson (born 1948)
- Dana Gillespie (born 1949)
- Sheila Gish (1942–2005)
- Leslie Grantham (1947–2018)
- Pamela Greer (1941–2026) (born in Zambia)
- Derek Griffiths (born 1946)
- Richard Griffiths (1947–2013)
- Georgina Hale (1943–2024)
- Prentis Hancock (1942–2025)
- Richard Heffer (born 1946)
- Nicky Henson (1945–2019)
- Bernard Hill (1944–2024)
- Frazer Hines (born 1944)
- Patricia Hodge (born 1946)
- Julian Holloway (1944–2025)
- Bob Hoskins (1942–2014)
- Geoffrey Hughes (1944–2012)
- Nerys Hughes (born 1941)
- Gareth Hunt (1942–2007)
- John Hurt (1940–2017)
- Judy Huxtable (born 1942)
- Jonathan Hyde (born 1948)
- Eric Idle (born 1943)
- Jeremy Irons (born 1948)
- Philip Jackson (born 1948)
- Oscar James (born 1942)
- Susan Jameson (born 1941)
- Martin Jarvis (born 1941)
- David Jason (born 1940)
- Paul Jesson (born 1946)
- Caroline John (1940–2012)
- Sue Johnston (born 1943)
- Gemma Jones (born 1942)
- Nicholas Jones (born 1946)
- Paul Jones (born 1942)
- Terry Jones (1942–2020)
- Stefan Kalipha (born 1940)
- Michael Keating (1947–2026)
- Diane Keen (born 1946)
- Penelope Keith (1940–2026)
- Sam Kelly (1943–2014)
- Felicity Kendal (born 1946)
- Cheryl Kennedy (born 1947)
- Ben Kingsley (born 1943)
- Jeffery Kissoon (born 1947)
- Michael Kitchen (born 1948)
- Alan Lake (1940–1984)
- Jane Lapotaire (1944–2026)
- Ian Lavender (1946–2024)
- Rula Lenska (born 1947)
- Valerie Leon (born 1943)
- Denis Lill (born 1942)
- Robert Lindsay (born 1949)
- Maureen Lipman (born 1946)
- Roger Lloyd-Pack (1944–2014)
- Judy Loe (1947–2025)
- Joanna Lumley (born 1946) (born in Srinagar, India)
- John Mahoney (1940–2018) (naturalised American citizen)
- Patrick Malahide (born 1945)
- Katy Manning (born 1946)
- Miriam Margolyes (born 1941)
- Ian Marter (1944–1986)
- Judy Matheson (born 1945)
- Sylvester McCoy (born 1943)
- Ian McDiarmid (born 1944)
- Malcolm McDowell (born 1943) (naturalised American citizen)
- Julia McKenzie (born 1941)
- Ian McShane (born 1942)
- Clive Merrison (born 1945)
- Sarah Miles (born 1941)
- Brian Miller (born 1941)
- Hayley Mills (born 1946)
- Juliet Mills (born 1941) (naturalised American citizen)
- Helen Mirren (born 1945)
- Terry Molloy (born 1947)
- Angela Morant (1941–2026)
- Caroline Munro (born 1949)

=== N–Z ===
- John Nettles (born 1943)
- Olivia Newton-John (1948–2022)
- Paul Nicholas (born 1944)
- Bill Nighy (born 1949)
- Margaret Nolan (1943–2020)
- Frank Oz (born 1944)
- Maureen O'Brien (born 1943)
- Ian Ogilvy (born 1943)
- Elaine Paige (born 1948)
- Michael Palin (born 1943)
- Bill Paterson (born 1945)
- Jacqueline Pearce (1943–2018)
- Susan Penhaligon (born 1949)
- Joanna Pettet (1942–2026)
- Anton Phillips (born 1943) (born in Jamaica)
- Ronald Pickup (1940–2021)
- Tim Pigott-Smith (1946–2017)
- Angela Pleasence (1941–2026)
- Adrienne Posta (born 1949)
- Pete Postlethwaite (1946–2011)
- Robert Powell (born 1944)
- Jonathan Pryce (born 1947)
- Diana Quick (born 1946)
- Charlotte Rampling (born 1946)
- Lynn Redgrave (1943–2010)
- Angharad Rees (1944–2012)
- Roger Rees (1944–2015) (naturalised American citizen)
- Mike Reid (1940–2007)
- John Rhys-Davies (born 1944)
- Wendy Richard (1943–2009)
- Alan Rickman (1946–2016)
- Sheila Ruskin (born 1946)
- Clive Russell (born 1945)
- Roshan Seth (born 1942)
- Martin Shaw (born 1945)
- Catherine Schell (born 1944)
- Robert Sidaway (1942–2024)
- William Simons (1940–2019)
- Elisabeth Sladen (1946–2011)
- David Soul (1943–2024) (naturalised British citizen)
- Ringo Starr (born 1940)
- Alison Steadman (born 1946)
- Patrick Stewart (1940–2026)
- David Suchet (born 1946)
- Nigel Terry (1945–2015)
- John Thaw (1942–2002)
- Christopher Timothy (born 1940)
- Frances de la Tour (born 1944)
- Rita Tushingham (born 1942)
- Twiggy (born 1949)
- Nick Ullett (born 1941) (naturalised American citizen)
- Zoë Wanamaker (born 1949) (born in New York City; naturalised American citizen)
- David Warbeck (1941–1997)
- David Warner (1941–2022)
- James Warwick (born 1947)
- Dennis Waterman (1948–2022)
- Deborah Watling (1948–2017)
- Dilys Watling (1943–2021)
- Carol White (1943–1991)
- Sheila White (1948–2018)
- Tom Wilkinson (1948–2023)
- Kate Williams (born 1941)
- Anneke Wills (born 1941)
- Hamish Wilson (1942–2020)
- Penelope Wilton (born 1946)
- Tessa Wyatt (born 1948)
- Stephen Yardley (born 1942)
- Michael York (born 1942)

== Born in the 1950s ==
=== A–M ===
- Jenny Agutter (born 1952)
- Roger Allam (born 1953)
- Keith Allen (born 1953)
- Kevin Allen (born 1959)
- John Altman (born 1952)
- Debbie Arnold (born 1955)
- Robin Askwith (born 1950)
- Rowan Atkinson (born 1955)
- Imogen Bain (1959–2014)
- David Banks (born 1951)
- Paul Barber (born 1951)
- Michael Barrymore (born 1952)
- Robert Bathurst (born 1957)
- Sean Bean (born 1959)
- Tim Bentinck (born 1953)
- Philip Bretherton (born 1955)
- Moira Brooker (born 1957)
- Philip Martin Brown (born 1956)
- Ralph Brown (born 1957)
- Suzanne Burden (born 1958)
- Kate Burton (born 1957) (born in Geneva, Switzerland; has British and American citizenship)
- Peter Capaldi (born 1958)
- Jane Carr (born 1950)
- Kim Cattrall (born 1956) (Anglo-Canadian-American)
- Maxwell Caulfield (born 1959) (naturalised American citizen)
- Simon Chandler (born 1953)
- Daniel Chatto (born 1957)
- Keith Chegwin (1957–2017)
- Julie Dawn Cole (born 1957)
- Phil Collins (born 1951)
- Robbie Coltrane (1950–2022)
- Gerry Cowper (born 1958)
- Doña Croll (born 1953)
- Phil Davis (born 1953)
- Peter Davison (born 1951)
- Daniel Day-Lewis (born 1957)
- Angus Deayton (born 1956)
- Les Dennis (born 1953)
- Reece Dinsdale (born 1959)
- Karen Dotrice (born 1955)
- Sarah Douglas (born 1952)
- Lesley-Anne Down (born 1954) (naturalised American citizen)
- Lindsay Duncan (born 1950)
- Sheena Easton (born 1959) (naturalised American citizen)
- Kevin Eldon (born 1959)
- Trevor Eve (born 1951)
- Rupert Everett (born 1959)
- Nicholas Farrell (born 1955)
- Peter Firth (born 1953)
- Fish (born 1958)
- Marsha Fitzalan (born 1953) (born in Bonn, West Germany)
- Frances Fisher (born 1952) (naturalised American citizen)
- Pamela Franklin (born 1950) (born in Yokohama, Japan)
- Sabina Franklyn (born 1954)
- Lynne Frederick (1954–1994)
- Dawn French (born 1957)
- Stephen Fry (born 1957)
- Fiona Fullerton (born 1956) (born in Nigeria)
- Susan George (born 1950)
- Candace Glendenning (born 1953)
- Liza Goddard (born 1950)
- Caroline Goodall (born 1959)
- Richard E. Grant (born 1957) (born in Mbabane, Swaziland)
- Cathryn Harrison (1959–2018)
- Nigel Havers (born 1951)
- Anthony Head (1954–2026)
- Lenny Henry (born 1958)
- Sherrie Hewson (born 1950)
- Ciarán Hinds (born 1953)
- Jane How (born 1950)
- Finola Hughes (born 1959)
- Olivia Hussey (1951–2024)
- Alex Hyde-White (born 1959) (naturalised American citizen)
- Celia Imrie (born 1952)
- Geraldine James (born 1950)
- Louise Jameson (born 1951)
- David Janson (born 1950)
- Alex Jennings (born 1957)
- Gerard Kelly (1959–2010)
- Gary Kemp (born 1959)
- Alice Krige (born 1954) (born in Upington, South Africa)
- Trevor Laird (born 1957)
- Wayne Laryea (born 1952)
- Hugh Laurie (born 1959)
- Josie Lawrence (born 1959)
- Sylvestra Le Touzel (born 1958)
- Nigel Le Vaillant (born 1957)
- Helen Lederer (born 1954)
- Delroy Lindo (born 1952) (British-American)
- Robert Llewellyn (born 1956)
- Phyllis Logan (born 1956)
- Cherie Lunghi (born 1952)
- Kenneth MacDonald (1950–2001)
- Art Malik (born 1952)
- Lesley Manville (born 1956)
- Rik Mayall (1958–2014)
- Steve McFadden (born 1959)
- Joe McGann (born 1958)
- Paul McGann (born 1959)
- Peter Mensah (born 1959) (born in Ghana)
- Alfred Molina (born 1953) (naturalised American citizen)
- Fiona Mollison (born 1954)
- Wendy Morgan (born 1958)
- Peter Mullan (born 1959)

=== N–Z ===
- Liam Neeson (born 1952) (naturalised American citizen)
- Vincenzo Nicoli (born 1958)
- Cindy O'Callaghan (born 1956) (born in Ireland)
- Gary Oldman (born 1958)
- Helen Pearson (born 1959)
- Julie Peasgood (born 1956)
- Hugh Quarshie (born 1954) (born in Ghana)
- Pauline Quirke (born 1959)
- Adrian Rawlins (born 1958)
- Ian Reddington (born 1957)
- Amanda Redman (born 1957)
- Miranda Richardson (born 1958)
- Laurance Rudic (born 1952)
- Patrick Ryecart (born 1952)
- Jennifer Saunders (born 1958)
- David Schofield (born 1951)
- Jenny Seagrove (born 1957) (born in Malaya)
- Nabil Shaban (1953–2025) (born in Amman, Jordan)
- Jane Seymour (born 1951) (naturalised American citizen)
- Ruth Sheen (born 1950)
- Jeremy Sinden (1950–1996)
- Marc Sinden (born 1954)
- Marina Sirtis (born 1955) (naturalised American citizen)
- Tony Slattery (1959–2025)
- Timothy Spall (born 1957)
- Imelda Staunton (born 1956)
- Juliet Stevenson (born 1956)
- Sting (born 1951)
- Mark Strickson (born 1959)
- Trudie Styler (born 1954)
- Mary Tamm (1950–2012)
- Simon Templeman (born 1954)
- Emma Thompson (born 1959)
- Sally Thomsett (born 1950)
- Harriet Thorpe (born 1957)
- David Threlfall (born 1953)
- Primi Townsend (born 1951)
- David Troughton (born 1950)
- Michael Troughton (born 1955)
- Tracey Ullman (born 1959) (naturalised American citizen)
- Rupert Vansittart (born 1958)
- Julian Wadham (born 1958)
- Harriet Walter (born 1950)
- Julie Walters (born 1950)
- Lalla Ward (born 1951)
- Rachel Ward (born 1957)
- Don Warrington (born 1951) (born in Trinidad)
- Giles Watling (born 1953)
- Kevin Whately (born 1951)
- Peter Wight (born 1950)
- James Wilby (born 1958)
- Jack Wild (1952–2006)
- Mark Williams (born 1959)
- Gary Wilmot (born 1954)
- Ray Winstone (born 1957)
- Victoria Wood (1953–2016)
- Helen Worth (born 1951)
- Susan Wooldridge (born 1950)
- David Yip (born 1951)
- Benjamin Zephaniah (1958–2023)

== Born in the 1960s ==
=== A–M ===
- Mark Addy (born 1964)
- Caroline Aherne (1963–2016)
- Holly Aird (born 1969)
- Adewale Akinnuoye-Agbaje (born 1967)
- Sophie Aldred (born 1962)
- Adjoa Andoh (born 1963)
- Naveen Andrews (born 1969) (naturalised American citizen)
- Lysette Anthony (born 1963)
- Lorraine Ashbourne (born 1961)
- Bill Bailey (born 1965)
- Matt Bardock (born 1969)
- Chris Barrie (born 1960)
- John Barrowman (born 1967) (dual British and American citizenship)
- Simon Russell Beale (born 1961) (born in Penang, Malaysia)
- Samantha Beckinsale (born 1966)
- Gina Bellman (born 1966) (born in Auckland, New Zealand)
- Nick Berry (born 1963)
- Jesse Birdsall (born 1963)
- Caroline Bliss (born 1961)
- Samantha Bond (born 1961)
- Helena Bonham Carter (born 1966)
- Hugh Bonneville (born 1963)
- Kenneth Branagh (born 1960)
- Lucy Briers (born 1967)
- Kathy Burke (born 1964)
- Josette Bushell-Mingo (born 1964)
- Gerard Butler (born 1969)
- Robert Carlyle (born 1961)
- Raquel Cassidy (born 1968)
- Caroline Catz (born 1969)
- Anna Chancellor (born 1965)
- Ben Chaplin (born 1969)
- Craig Charles (born 1964)
- Maggie Cheung (born 1964) (born in British Hong Kong)
- Tracey Childs (born 1963)
- Flaminia Cinque (born 1964)
- Martin Clunes (born 1961)
- Lucy Cohu (born 1968)
- Michelle Collins (born 1962)
- Jason Connery (born 1963)
- Steve Coogan (born 1965)
- Daniel Craig (born 1968) (naturalised American citizen)
- Greg Cruttwell (born 1960)
- Alan Cumming (born 1965) (naturalised American citizen)
- Henry Ian Cusick (born 1967) (born in Peru)
- Alan Davies (born 1966)
- Hugh Dennis (born 1962)
- Amanda Donohoe (born 1962)
- Neil Dudgeon (born 1961)
- Noma Dumezweni (born 1969) (born in Swaziland)
- Blythe Duff (born 1962)
- Jason Durr (born 1967) (born in Singapore)
- Christopher Eccleston (born 1964)
- Cary Elwes (born 1962)
- Harry Enfield (born 1961)
- Michelle Fairley (born 1963)
- Craig Ferguson (born 1962) (naturalised American citizen)
- Ralph Fiennes (born 1962)
- Siobhan Finneran (born 1966)
- Colin Firth (born 1960)
- Tommy Flanagan (born 1965)
- Jason Flemyng (born 1966)
- Dexter Fletcher (born 1966)
- Geff Francis (born 1964)
- Michael French (born 1962)
- Maria Friedman (born 1960) (born in Switzerland)
- Sadie Frost (born 1965)
- Jenny Funnell (born 1963)
- Mark Gatiss (born 1966)
- Ruth Gemmell (born 1967)
- Ricky Gervais (born 1961)
- Don Gilet (born 1967)
- Lou Gish (1967–2006)
- Philip Glenister (born 1963)
- Robert Glenister (born 1960)
- Adam Godley (born 1964)
- Michelle Gomez (born 1966)
- Tom Goodman-Hill (born 1968)
- Julie Graham (born 1965)
- Hugh Grant (born 1960)
- Rupert Graves (born 1963)
- Michelle Greenidge (born 1969)
- Robson Green (born 1964)
- Tamsin Greig (born 1966)
- Suzanna Hamilton (born 1960)
- John Hannah (born 1962)
- David Harewood (born 1965)
- Caroline Harker (born 1966)
- Susannah Harker (born 1965)
- Jared Harris (born 1961)
- Sean Harris (born 1966)
- Ian Hart (born 1964)
- Tamer Hassan (born 1968)
- Greg Hemphill (born 1969)
- Shirley Henderson (born 1965)
- Ruthie Henshall (born 1967)
- Tom Hollander (born 1967)
- Jane Horrocks (born 1964)
- Steve Huison (born 1962)
- Elizabeth Hurley (born 1965)
- Llŷr Ifans (born 1968)
- Rhys Ifans (born 1967)
- Jason Isaacs (born 1963)
- Kate Isitt (born 1965)
- Judith Jacob (born 1961)
- Lennie James (born 1965)
- Marianne Jean-Baptiste (born 1967)
- Danny John-Jules (born 1960)
- Toby Jones (born 1966)
- Vinnie Jones (born 1965)
- Paterson Joseph (born 1964)
- Hakeem Kae-Kazim (born 1962) (born in Lagos, Nigeria)
- Martin Kemp (born 1961)
- Ross Kemp (born 1964)
- Patsy Kensit (born 1968)
- Ford Kiernan (born 1962)
- Claire King (born 1962)
- Alex Kingston (born 1963)
- Jo-Anne Knowles (born 1969)
- Kwame Kwei-Armah (born 1967)
- Sarah Lancashire (born 1964)
- Bonnie Langford (born 1964)
- Chris Larkin (born 1967)
- Jane Leeves (born 1961)
- Dave Legeno (1963–2014)
- Adrian Lester (born 1968)
- Natasha Little (born 1969)
- Richard Lumsden (born 1965)
- Nicholas Lyndhurst (born 1961)
- Eddie Marsan (born 1968)
- Jo Martin (born 1969)
- Helen McCrory (1968–2021)
- Sandy McDade (born 1964)
- Colin McFarlane (born 1961)
- Mark McGann (born 1961)
- Stephen McGann (born 1963)
- Josephine Melville (1961–2022)
- Ben Miles (born 1966)
- Ben Miller (born 1966)
- Poppy Miller (born 1969)
- David Morrissey (born 1964)
- Neil Morrissey (born 1962)
- Stephen Moyer (born 1969)

=== N–Z ===
- James Nesbitt (born 1965)
- Hermione Norris (born 1967)
- Jeremy Northam (born 1961)
- Cyril Nri (born 1961)
- David O'Hara (born 1965)
- Tracy-Ann Oberman (born 1966)
- Femi Elufowoju Jr. (born 1962)
- Sophie Okonedo (born 1968)
- Julia Ormond (born 1965)
- Clive Owen (born 1964)
- Lisa Palfrey (born 1967)
- Sarah Parish (born 1968)
- Nathaniel Parker (born 1962)
- Sean Pertwee (born 1964)
- James Purefoy (born 1964)
- Caroline Quentin (born 1960)
- Jemma Redgrave (born 1965)
- Saskia Reeves (born 1961)
- Joely Richardson (born 1965)
- Natasha Richardson (1963–2009)
- Fay Ripley (born 1966)
- Linus Roache (born 1964)
- Tim Roth (born 1961)
- Clive Rowe (born 1964)
- Catherine Russell (born 1966)
- Daniel Ryan (born 1968)
- Mark Rylance (born 1960)
- Rebecca Saire (born 1963)
- Colin Salmon (born 1961)
- Emma Samms (born 1960)
- Julia Sawalha (born 1968)
- Nadia Sawalha (born 1964)
- Joanna Scanlan (born 1961)
- Adrian Scarborough (born 1968)
- Katharine Schlesinger (born 1963)
- Dougray Scott (born 1965)
- Kristin Scott Thomas (born 1960)
- Andy Serkis (born 1964)
- Rufus Sewell (born 1967)
- Josette Simon (born 1960)
- Michael Sheen (born 1969)
- Mark Sheppard (born 1964)
- Alexander Siddig (born 1965) (born in Wad Madani, Sudan)
- Nina Sosanya (born 1969)
- Hugo Speer (born 1968)
- Samantha Spiro (born 1968)
- Jason Statham (born 1967)
- Toby Stephens (born 1969)
- Ray Stevenson (1964–2023)
- Mark Strong (born 1963)
- Imogen Stubbs (born 1961)
- Terry Sue-Patt (1964–2015)
- Peter Sullivan (born 1964)
- Sarah Sutton (born 1961)
- Tilda Swinton (born 1960)
- Meera Syal (born 1961)
- Catherine Tate (born 1969)
- David Thewlis (born 1963)
- Ellen Thomas (born 1964)
- Sophie Thompson (born 1962)
- Stephen Tompkinson (born 1965)
- Steve Toussaint (born 1965)
- Cathy Tyson (born 1965)
- Eamonn Walker (born 1962)
- Polly Walker (born 1966)
- Julie T. Wallace (born 1961)
- Bradley Walsh (born 1960)
- Marc Warren (born 1967)
- Emily Watson (born 1967)
- Naomi Watts (born 1968)
- Dominic West (born 1969)
- Samuel West (born 1966)
- Joanne Whalley (born 1964)
- Lia Williams (born 1964)
- Olivia Williams (born 1968)
- Peter Wingfield (born 1962)
- Adam Woodyatt (born 1968)
- Emily Woof (born 1967)
- Angus Wright (born 1964)
- Catherine Zeta-Jones (born 1969)

== Born in the 1970s ==
=== A–M ===
- Amanda Abbington (born 1974)
- Christine Adams (born 1974)
- Freema Agyeman (born 1979)
- Sarah Alexander (born 1971)
- Nikki Amuka-Bird (born 1976)
- Chloë Annett (born 1971)
- Nonso Anozie (born 1978)
- Gabrielle Anwar (born 1970) (naturalised American citizen)
- Lucy Akhurst (born 1970)
- Richard Armitage (born 1971)
- Alexander Armstrong (born 1970)
- Joe Armstrong (born 1978)
- Kate Ashfield (born 1972)
- Richard Ayoade (born 1977)
- Kate Baines (born 1978)
- Christian Bale (born 1974) (naturalised American citizen)
- Jamie Bamber (born 1973) (dual British and American citizen)
- Yasmin Bannerman (born 1970)
- Nicole Barber-Lane (born 1972)
- Sacha Baron Cohen (born 1971)
- Helen Baxendale (born 1970)
- Kate Beckinsale (born 1973)
- Max Beesley (born 1971)
- Elizabeth Berrington (born 1970)
- Matt Berry (born 1974)
- Eve Best (born 1971)
- Paul Bettany (born 1971)
- Orlando Bloom (born 1977)
- Vanessa Branch (born 1973) (dual British and American citizenship)
- Russell Brand (born 1975)
- Ewen Bremner (born 1970)
- Dannielle Brent (born 1979)
- Liz May Brice (born 1975)
- Kellie Bright (born 1976)
- Clare Buckfield (born 1976)
- Julie Buckfield (born 1976)
- Saffron Burrows (born 1972) (naturalised American citizen)
- Georgina Cates (born 1975)
- Noel Clarke (born 1975)
- Olivia Colman (born 1974)
- Shelley Conn (born 1976)
- Paddy Considine (born 1973)
- Dominic Cooper (born 1978)
- James Corden (born 1978)
- Christian Coulson (born 1978)
- Julie Cox (born 1973)
- Nathalie Cox (born 1978)
- Richard Coyle (born 1974)
- Mackenzie Crook (born 1971)
- Benedict Cumberbatch (born 1976)
- Hugh Dancy (born 1975)
- Jack Davenport (born 1973)
- Lucy Davis (born 1973)
- Warwick Davis (born 1970)
- Rupert Degas (born 1970)
- Dustin Demri-Burns (born 1978)
- Kate Dickie (born 1971)
- Mikyla Dodd (born 1978)
- Jason Done (born 1973)
- Shaun Dooley (born 1974)
- Minnie Driver (born 1970) (naturalised American citizen)
- Anne-Marie Duff (born 1970)
- Sharon Duncan-Brewster (born 1976)
- Terri Dwyer (born 1973)
- Danny Dyer (born 1977)
- Jeremy Edwards (born 1971)
- Chiwetel Ejiofor (born 1977)
- Idris Elba (born 1972)
- Tom Ellis (born 1978)
- Tameka Empson (born 1977)
- Luke Evans (born 1979)
- JJ Feild (born 1978) (born in Boulder, Colorado, United States) (British-American actor)
- Joseph Fiennes (born 1970)
- Emilia Fox (born 1974)
- Martin Freeman (born 1971)
- Anna Friel (born 1976)
- Nick Frost (born 1972)
- Dean Gaffney (born 1978)
- Charlotte Gainsbourg (born 1971)
- Matthew Goode (born 1978)
- Claire Goose (born 1975)
- Sarah Gordy (born 1978)
- Burn Gorman (born 1974) (born in Hollywood, California, United States)
- Stephen Graham (born 1973)
- Rachel Grant (born 1977)
- Eva Gray (born 1970)
- Angela Griffin (born 1976)
- Ioan Gruffudd (born 1973)
- Sienna Guillory (born 1975)
- Suzanne Hall (born 1972)
- Ian Hallard (born 1974)
- Tom Hardy (born 1977)
- Ricci Harnett (born 1973)
- Naomie Harris (born 1976)
- Jo Hartley (born 1972)
- Miranda Hart (born 1972)
- Keeley Hawes (born 1976)
- Sally Hawkins (born 1976)
- Rebecca Hazlewood (born 1977)
- Lena Headey (born 1973) (born in Hamilton, Bermuda)
- Christina Hendricks (born 1975) (dual British and American citizenship)
- Tina Hobley (born 1971)
- Anna Hope (born 1974)
- Jim Howick (born 1975)
- Jessica Hynes (born 1972)
- Jynine James (born 1972)
- Samantha Janus (born 1972)
- Tonicha Jeronimo (born 1977)
- Susy Kane (born 1978)
- Rose Keegan (born 1971)
- Katherine Kelly (born 1979)
- Alison King (born 1973)
- Sanjeev Kohli (born 1971)
- Martina Laird (born 1971)
- Andrew Lancel (born 1970)
- Jude Law (born 1972)
- Adam Levy (born 1970)
- Damian Lewis (born 1971)
- Andrew Lincoln (born 1973)
- Emily Lloyd (born 1970)
- Jamie Lomas (born 1975)
- Louise Lombard (born 1970)
- Matt Lucas (born 1974)
- Kelly Macdonald (born 1976)
- Matthew Macfadyen (born 1974)
- Anna Maxwell Martin (born 1977)
- Kris Marshall (born 1973)
- Jodhi May (born 1975)
- James McAvoy (born 1979)
- Ewan McGregor (born 1971)
- Tobias Menzies (born 1974)
- Stephen Merchant (born 1974)
- Jonny Lee Miller (born 1972) (naturalised American citizen)
- Wentworth Miller (born 1972) (dual British and American citizenship)
- Jimi Mistry (born 1973)
- Rhona Mitra (born 1976)
- Dominic Monaghan (born 1976)
- Tanya Moodie (born 1972) (born in Canada)
- Hattie Morahan (born 1978)
- Tara Moran (born 1971)
- Emily Mortimer (born 1971) (naturalised American citizen)
- Samantha Morton (born 1977)
- Diane Morgan (born 1975)
- Lucian Msamati (born 1976) (British-Tanzanian)
- Richard Mylan (born 1973)
- Eve Myles (born 1978)

=== N–Z ===
- Parminder Nagra (born 1975)
- Thandiwe Newton (born 1972)
- Kerry Norton (born 1974)
- Chris Obi (born 1970)
- John Oliver (born 1977)
- DeObia Oparei (born 1971)
- Tamzin Outhwaite (born 1970)
- David Oyelowo (born 1976) (naturalised American citizen)
- Joanna Page (born 1977)
- Patsy Palmer (born 1972)
- Archie Panjabi (born 1972)
- Ray Panthaki (born 1979)
- Ray Park (born 1974)
- Shaun Parkes (born 1973)
- Martin Parr (born 1970)
- Sarah Patterson (born 1970)
- Maxine Peake (born 1974)
- Simon Pegg (born 1970)
- Rupert Penry-Jones (born 1970)
- Alistair Petrie (born 1970)
- Sally Phillips (born 1970)
- Nick Pickard (born 1975)
- Rosamund Pike (born 1979)
- Nicholas Pinnock (born 1973)
- Hugh Pollard (born 1975)
- Lucy Punch (born 1977)
- James Redmond (born 1971)
- Matthew Rhys (born 1974)
- Zuleikha Robinson (born 1977)
- Golda Rosheuvel (born 1970) (born in Guyana)
- Laila Rouass (born 1971)
- Danny Sapani (born 1970)
- Andrew Scarborough (born 1973)
- Peter Serafinowicz (born 1972)
- John Simm (born 1970)
- Dan Renton Skinner (born 1973)
- Harvey Spencer Stephens (born 1970)
- Nicola Stapleton (born 1974)
- Rachael Stirling (born 1977) - see Diana Rigg (1938–2020)
- Jim Sturgess (born 1978)
- Claire Sweeney (born 1971)
- Davinia Taylor (born 1977)
- Joanna Taylor (born 1978)
- Kerrie Taylor (born 1973)
- Giles Terera (born 1976)
- David Tennant (born 1971)
- Marsha Thomason (born 1976)
- Indira Varma (born 1973) (dual British and Swiss citizenship)
- Johnny Vegas (born 1970)
- Charles Venn (born 1973)
- Hannah Waddingham (born 1974)
- Sonya Walger (born 1974) (naturalised American citizen)
- Nicola Walker (born 1970)
- David Walliams (born 1971)
- Honeysuckle Weeks (born 1979)
- Rachel Weisz (born 1970) (naturalised American citizen)
- Joe Wilkinson (born 1975)
- Finty Williams (born 1972)
- Kate Winslet (born 1975)
- Duncan Wisbey (born 1971)
- Benedict Wong (born 1971)
- Owain Yeoman (born 1978)
- Rik Young (born 1978)

== Born in the 1980s ==
=== A–H ===
- Zahra Ahmadi (born 1982)
- Riz Ahmed (born 1982)
- Laura Aikman (born 1985)
- David Ajala (born 1986)
- Fisayo Akinade (born 1987)
- Edward Akrout (born 1982)
- Jodi Albert (born 1983)
- Ben Aldridge (born 1985)
- Alfie Allen (born 1986)
- Lisa Ambalavanar (born 1988)
- Aml Ameen (born 1985)
- Susie Amy (born 1981)
- Jonas Armstrong (born 1981) (born in Dublin, Ireland)
- Ritu Arya (born 1988)
- Clare-Hope Ashitey (born 1987)
- Zawe Ashton (born 1984)
- Gemma Arterton (born 1986)
- Emily Atack (born 1989)
- Aimie Atkinson (born 1987)
- Gemma Atkinson (born 1984)
- Hayley Atwell (born 1982) (dual British and American citizenship)
- Afshan Azad (born 1988)
- Jonathan Bailey (born 1988)
- Matt Barber (born 1983)
- Aneurin Barnard (born 1987)
- Ben Barnes (born 1981)
- Mischa Barton (born 1986) (naturalised American citizen)
- Ali Bastian (born 1982)
- Joey Batey (born 1989)
- Ben Batt (born 1986)
- Mathew Baynton (born 1980)
- Emily Beecham (born 1984) (dual British and American citizenship)
- Jamie Bell (born 1986)
- Rolan Bell (born 1983)
- Kingsley Ben-Adir (born 1986)
- Pippa Bennett-Warner (born 1988)
- Emily Berrington (born 1985)
- Lydia Rose Bewley (born 1985)
- Jennifer Biddall (born 1980)
- Sean Biggerstaff (born 1983)
- Gemma Bissix (born 1983)
- Emily Blunt (born 1983) (naturalised American citizen)
- Cressida Bonas (born 1989)
- Zoe Boyle (born 1989)
- Charlie Brooks (born 1981)
- Jamie Campbell Bower (born 1988)
- Hollie-Jay Bowes (born 1989)
- Josh Bowman (born 1988)
- Anna Brewster (born 1986)
- Tom Burke (born 1981)
- Guy Burnet (born 1983)
- Ryan Cartwright (born 1981)
- Natalie Casey (born 1980)
- Natalie Cassidy (born 1983)
- Jessie Cave (born 1987)
- Henry Cavill (born 1983)
- Gemma Chan (born 1982)
- Carla Chases (born 1984)
- Christina Chong (born 1983)
- Shefali Chowdhury (born 1988)
- Charlotte Church (born 1986)
- Sam Claflin (born 1986)
- Morfydd Clark (born 1989) (born in Sweden)
- Emilia Clarke (born 1986)
- Klariza Clayton (born 1989)
- Sian Clifford (born 1982)
- Margaret Clunie (born 1987)
- Michaela Coel (born 1987)
- Joe Cole (born 1988)
- Lily Cole (born 1988)
- Jenna Coleman (born 1986)
- Lily Collins (born 1989) (naturalised American citizen)
- Christian Cooke (born 1987)
- Claire Cooper (born 1980)
- Kari Corbett (born 1984)
- Angel Coulby (born 1980)
- Alice Coulthard (born 1983)
- Charlie Cox (born 1982)
- Lenora Crichlow (born 1985)
- Karla Crome (born 1988)
- Ben Cura (born 1988) (born in Argentina)
- Yrsa Daley-Ward (born 1989)
- Arthur Darvill (born 1982)
- Gareth David-Lloyd (born 1981)
- Ashley Taylor Dawson (born 1982)
- Jamie Demetriou (born 1987) (British-Cypriot)
- Joe Dempsie (born 1987/1988)
- Sacha Dhawan (born 1984)
- Sophia Di Martino (born 1983)
- Michelle Dockery (born 1981)
- Natalie Dormer (born 1982)
- Jamie Dornan (born 1982)
- Kathryn Drysdale (born 1981)
- Sarah Jayne Dunn (born 1981)
- Aimee-Ffion Edwards (born 1987)
- Tamsin Egerton (born 1988)
- Taron Egerton (born 1989)
- Jessica Ellerby (born 1986) (born in Dubai)
- Nathalie Emmanuel (born 1989)
- Alfred Enoch (born 1988)
- Lucy Evans (born 1985)
- Alice Eve (born 1982) (naturalised American citizen)
- Lloyd Everitt (born 1987)
- O-T Fagbenle (born 1981)
- Leila Farzad (born 1983)
- Louisa Faye (born 1989)
- Emerald Fennell (born 1985)
- Tom Felton (born 1987)
- Jessica Brown Findlay (born 1987)
- Johnny Flynn (born 1983)
- Jacob Fortune-Lloyd (born 1988)
- Jessica Fox (born 1983)
- Phoebe Fox (born 1987)
- Claire Foy (born 1984)
- Lily Frazer (born 1988)
- Rupert Friend (born 1981)
- Joanne Froggatt (born 1980)
- Elyes Gabel (born 1983)
- Romola Garai (born 1982) (born in Hong Kong)
- Andrew Garfield (born 1983) (dual British and American citizenship; born in Los Angeles, California, United States)
- Chris Geere (born 1981)
- Samia Ghadie (born 1982)
- Mandip Gill (born 1988)
- Karen Gillan (born 1987)
- Henry Golding (born 1987) (born in Betong, Malaysia)
- Holliday Grainger (born 1988)
- Kelly Greenwood (born 1982)
- Lucy Griffiths (born 1986)
- Rupert Grint (born 1988)
- Kevin Guthrie (born 1988)
- David Gyasi (born 1980)
- Leah Hackett (born 1985)
- Rebecca Hall (born 1982) (dual British and American citizenship)
- Rosalind Halstead (born 1984)
- Rasmus Hardiker (born 1985)
- Kit Harington (born 1986)
- Lauren Harris (born 1984)
- Aiysha Hart (born 1988)
- Toby Hemingway (born 1983)
- Sam Heughan (born 1980)
- Mitch Hewer (born 1989)
- Tom Hiddleston (born 1981)
- Edward Holcroft (born 1987)
- Cara Horgan (born 1984)
- Nicholas Hoult (born 1989)
- Kirby Howell-Baptiste (born 1987)
- Tom Hughes (born 1985)
- Charlie Hunnam (born 1980)

=== I–Q ===
- Tracy Ifeachor (born 1985) (Nigerian-British)
- Daniel Ings (born 1985)
- Max Irons (born 1985)
- Bradley James (born 1983)
- Lily James (born 1989)
- Theo James (born 1984)
- Jameela Jamil (born 1986)
- Ciara Janson (born 1987)
- Kimberly Jaraj (born 1986)
- Claudia Jessie (born 1989)
- Felicity Jones (born 1983)
- Cush Jumbo (born 1985)
- Daniel Kaluuya (born 1989)
- Amara Karan (born 1984)
- Gerard Kearns (born 1984)
- Toby Kebbell (born 1982)
- Michelle Keegan (born 1987)
- Laura Michelle Kelly (born 1981)
- Emer Kenny (born 1989)
- Darren Kent (1984–2023)
- Maria Keogh (born 1982)
- Sair Khan (born 1988)
- Ferdinand Kingsley (born 1988)
- Brooke Kinsella (born 1983)
- Malachi Kirby (born 1989)
- Jemima Kirke (born 1985) (dual British and American citizenship)
- Keira Knightley (born 1985)
- Rahul Kohli (born 1985)
- Andrew Koji (born 1987)
- Gwilym Lee (born 1983)
- Stephanie Leonidas (born 1984)
- Rose Leslie (born 1987)
- Katie Leung (born 1987)
- Matthew Lewis (born 1989)
- Sarah Linda (born 1987)
- Zoë Lister (born 1982)
- Harry Lloyd (born 1983)
- Henry Lloyd-Hughes (born 1985)
- Thomas James Longley (born 1989)
- Ophelia Lovibond (born 1986)
- Gary Lucy (born 1981)
- Jing Lusi (born in 1985) (born in Pudong, Shanghai, China)
- Lashana Lynch (born 1987)
- Kate Maberly (born 1982)
- Pearl Mackie (born 1987)
- Richard Madden (born 1986)
- Ashley Madekwe (born 1983)
- Ruth Madeley (born 1987)
- Eleanor Matsuura (born 1983) (born in Tokyo, Japan)
- Gugu Mbatha-Raw (born 1983)
- Matt McCooey (born 1981)
- Matthew McNulty (born 1982)
- Harry Melling (born 1989)
- Tamzin Merchant (born 1987)
- Tuppence Middleton (born 1987)
- Sienna Miller (born 1981) (dual British and American citizenship; born in New York City)
- Max Minghella (born 1985)
- Tom Mison (born 1982)
- Sonoya Mizuno (born 1986) (born in Tokyo, Japan)
- Neet Mohan (born 1985)
- Zackary Momoh (born 1988)
- Janet Montgomery (born 1985)
- Colin Morgan (born 1986)
- Joseph Morgan (born 1981)
- William Moseley (born 1987)
- Sinéad Moynihan (born 1982)
- Ashley Mulheron (born 1983)
- Tiffany Mulheron (born 1984)
- Carey Mulligan (born 1985)
- Hannah Murray (born 1989)
- Sophia Myles (born 1980)
- Adam Nagaitis (born 1985)
- Kunal Nayyar (born 1981)
- Hannah New (born 1984)
- Mary Nighy (born 1984)
- David Oakes (born 1983)
- Michael Obiora (born 1986)
- Tina O'Brien (born 1983)
- Natasha O'Keeffe (born 1986)
- Chiké Okonkwo (born 1981)
- Weruche Opia (born 1987) (born in Lagos, Nigeria)
- Regé-Jean Page (born 1988)
- Luke Pasqualino (born 1989)
- Nikesh Patel (born 1985)
- Robert Pattinson (born 1986)
- April Pearson (born 1989)
- James Phelps (born 1986)
- Oliver Phelps (born 1986)
- Royce Pierreson (born 1989)
- Billie Piper (born 1982)
- Chloe Pirrie (born 1987)
- Imogen Poots (born 1989)
- Anna Popplewell (born 1988)
- Jorgie Porter (born 1987)
- Cassie Powney (born 1983)
- Connie Powney (born 1983)
- Ryan Prescott (born 1989)

=== R–Z ===
- Daniel Radcliffe (born 1989)
- George Rainsford (born 1982)
- Richard Rankin (born 1983)
- Eddie Redmayne (born 1982)
- Iwan Rheon (born 1985)
- Emma Rigby (born 1989)
- Charlotte Riley (born 1981)
- Talulah Riley (born 1985)
- Charlotte Ritchie (born 1989)
- Alexandra Roach (born 1987)
- James Roache (born 1985)
- Iain Robertson (born 1981)
- Morgana Robinson (born 1982)
- Sharon Rooney (born 1988)
- Jemima Rooper (born 1981)
- Tom Rosenthal (born 1988)
- Samantha Rowley (born 1988)
- Sophie Rundle (born 1988)
- Verity Rushworth (born 1985)
- Matt Ryan (born 1981)
- Michelle Ryan (born 1984)
- Amit Shah (born 1981)
- Victoria Shalet (born 1981)
- Daniel Sharman (born 1986)
- Will Sharpe (born 1986)
- Judi Shekoni (born 1982)
- Jack P. Shepherd (born 1988)
- Adele Silva (born 1980)
- Hugh Skinner (born 1985)
- Ashley Slanina-Davies (born 1989)
- Matt Smith (born 1982)
- Sheridan Smith (born 1981)
- Rafe Spall (born 1983)
- Flora Spencer-Longhurst (born 1985)
- Clive Standen (born 1981)
- Carley Stenson (born 1982)
- Dan Stevens (born 1982)
- Catrin Stewart (born 1988)
- Nathan Stewart-Jarrett (born 1985)
- Lucy St. Louis (born 1986/1987)
- Benjamin Stone (born 1987)
- Tom Stourton (born 1987)
- Scarlett Strallen (born 1982)
- Summer Strallen (born 1985)
- Zizi Strallen (born 1990)
- Tom Sturridge (born 1985)
- James Sutton (born 1983)
- Daniel Lawrence Taylor (born 1983)
- Juno Temple (born 1989)
- Natalia Tena (born 1984)
- Georgia Tennant (born 1984)
- Rakhee Thakrar (born 1984)
- Phoebe Thomas (born 1983)
- Luke Thompson (born 1988)
- Gabriel Thomson (born 1986)
- Elliott Tittensor (born 1989)
- Luke Tittensor (born 1989)
- Hannah Tointon (born 1987)
- Kara Tointon (born 1983)
- Elize du Toit (born 1980) (born in Grahamstown, South Africa)
- Nina Toussaint-White (born 1985)
- Russell Tovey (born 1981)
- Harry Treadaway (born 1984)
- Luke Treadaway (born 1984)
- Jodie Turner-Smith (born 1986)
- Lacey Turner (born 1988)
- Charity Wakefield (born 1980)
- Phoebe Waller-Bridge (born 1985)
- Annabelle Wallis (born 1984)
- Anna Walton (born 1980)
- Hannah Ware (born 1982)
- Al Weaver (born 1981)
- Charley Webb (born 1988)
- Ed Weeks (born 1980)
- Anthony Welsh (born 1983)
- Ed Westwick (born 1987)
- Gemma Whelan (born 1981)
- Ben Whishaw (born 1980)
- Jack Whitehall (born 1988)
- Jodie Whittaker (born 1982)
- Ricky Whittle (born 1981)
- Gabriella Wilde (born 1989)
- Larissa Wilson (born 1989)
- Ruth Wilson (born 1982)
- Sophie Winkleman (born 1980)
- Jaime Winstone (born 1985)
- Gabriella Wright (born 1982) (naturalised French citizen)
- Luke Youngblood (born 1986)

== Born in the 1990s ==
=== A–M ===
- Marisa Abela (born 1996)
- Samuel Adewunmi (born 1994)
- Eubha Akilade (born 1998)
- Jessica Allain (born 1997)
- Patricia Allison (born 1994)
- Jessica Alexander (born 1999)
- Olly Alexander (born 1990)
- Joe Alwyn (born 1991)
- Amber Anderson (born 1992)
- Jacob Anderson (born 1990)
- Emma Appleton (born 1991)
- Jasmine Armfield (born 1998)
- Ruby Ashbourne Serkis (born 1998)
- Simone Ashley (born 1995)
- Percelle Ascott (born 1993) (born in Zimbabwe)
- Rose Ayling-Ellis (born 1994)
- Ella Balinska (born 1996)
- Ellie Bamber (born 1997)
- Manpreet Bambra (born 1992)
- Jasmyn Banks (born 1990)
- Lucy May Barker (born 1992)
- Ruby Barker (born 1996)
- Samantha Barks (born 1990)
- Helena Barlow (born 1998)
- Sabrina Bartlett (born 1991)
- Tommy Bastow (born 1991)
- Naomi Battrick (born 1991)
- James Baxter (born 1990)
- Charlotte Beaumont (born 1995)
- Sai Bennett (born 1990)
- Eliza Bennett (born 1992)
- Edward Bluemel (born 1993)
- Tom Blyth (born 1995)
- Alana Boden (born 1997)
- Douglas Booth (born 1992)
- Jamie Borthwick (born 1994)
- Max Bowden (born 1994)
- John Boyega (born 1992)
- Lucy Boynton (born 1994) (born in the United States)
- Cassie Bradley (born 1993)
- Thomas Brodie-Sangster (born 1990)
- Gabrielle Brooks (born 1990)
- Julia Brown (born 1997)
- Simona Brown (born 1994)
- Shalom Brune-Franklin (born 1994) (British-Australian)
- Céline Buckens (born 1996) (born in Belgium)
- Asa Butterfield (born 1997)
- Hetti Bywater (born 1994)
- Harriet Cains (born 1993)
- Georgina Campbell (born 1992)
- Bessie Carter (born 1993)
- Freddy Carter (born 1993)
- Anya Chalotra (born 1995/1996)
- Charithra Chandran (born 1997)
- Dean-Charles Chapman (born 1997)
- Antonia Clarke (born 1995)
- Sophie Kennedy Clark (born 1990)
- Tony Clay (born 1991)
- Rhiannon Clements (born 1994)
- Tosin Cole (born 1992)
- Hugh Coles (born 1992)
- Jodie Comer (born 1993)
- Olivia Cooke (born 1993)
- Sophie Cookson (born 1990)
- Saffron Coomber (born 1994)
- Hermione Corfield (born 1993)
- Emma Corrin (born 1995)
- Ellie Darcey-Alden (born 1999)
- Alexa Davies (born 1995)
- Jonno Davies (born 1992)
- Stephanie Davis (born 1993)
- Wallis Day (born 1994)
- Fern Deacon (born 1998)
- Cara Delevingne (born 1992)
- Gemma-Leah Devereux (born 1990)
- Sebastian de Souza (born 1993)
- Mandeep Dhillon (born 1990)
- Hannah Dodd (born 1995)
- Thomas Doherty (born 1995)
- Omari Douglas (born 1994)
- Poppy Drayton (born 1991)
- Tyger Drew-Honey (born 1996)
- Lucinda Dryzek (born 1991)
- Madeline Duggan (born 1994)
- Phil Dunster (born 1992)
- Phoebe Dynevor (born 1995)
- Daisy Edgar-Jones (born 1998)
- Fady Elsayed (born 1993)
- Paapa Essiedu (born 1990)
- Lucy Fallon (born 1995)
- Otto Farrant (born 1996)
- Hero Fiennes-Tiffin (born 1997)
- Lorna Fitzgerald (born 1996)
- Shannon Flynn (born 1996)
- Georgia May Foote (born 1991)
- Hanako Footman (born 1994)
- Fabien Frankel (born 1994) (British-French)
- Nell Tiger Free (born 1999)
- Poppy Lee Friar (born 1995)
- Nicholas Galitzine (born 1994)
- Ncuti Gatwa (born 1992) (born in Kigali, Rwanda)
- Amelia Gething (born 1999)
- Poppy Gilbert (born 1998) (born in Stockholm, Sweden)
- Bally Gill (born 1992)
- Mia Goth (born 1993)
- Theo Graham (born 1997)
- Tallulah Greive (born 1997)
- Sorcha Groundsell (born 1998)
- Chelsea Halfpenny (born 1991)
- Ben Hardy (born 1991)
- Danielle Harold (born 1992)
- Tom Rhys Harries (born 1990)
- Bilal Hasna (born 1999)
- Danny Hatchard (born 1991)
- Jonah Hauer-King (born 1995)
- Daisy Head (born 1991)
- Charlie Heaton (born 1994)
- Isaac Hempstead Wright (born 1999)
- Georgie Henley (born 1995)
- Francesca Henry (born 1995)
- Georgia Henshaw (born 1993)
- Jessica Henwick (born 1992)
- Amy-Leigh Hickman (born 1997)
- Freddie Highmore (born 1992)
- Maddy Hill (born 1990)
- Saffron Hocking (born 1994)
- Isabel Hodgins (born 1993)
- Tom Holland (born 1996)
- Ellis Hollins (born 1999)
- Callum Scott Howells (born 1999)
- Izuka Hoyle (born 1996)
- Nell Hudson (born 1990)
- Ella Hunt (born 1998)
- Rachel Hurd-Wood (born 1990)
- Damson Idris (born 1991)
- Martins Imhangbe (born 1991) (British-Nigerian)
- Angus Imrie (born 1994)
- Kerry Ingram (born 1999)
- Jeremy Irvine (born 1990)
- Dominique Jackson (born 1991)
- Toheeb Jimoh (born 1997)
- Shaheen Jafargholi (born 1997)
- Shiv Jalota (born 1993)
- Amy James-Kelly (born 1995)
- Katie Jarvis (born 1991)
- David Jonsson (born 1993)
- Charlotte Jordan (born 1995)
- Jacqueline Jossa (born 1992)
- Synnøve Karlsen (born 1996)
- Brad Kavanagh (born 1992)
- Robbie Kay (born 1995)
- Mimi Keene (born 1998)
- Tilly Keeper (born 1997)
- Aimée Kelly (born 1993)
- Siena Kelly (born 1996)
- Erin Kellyman (born 1998)
- Ellie Kendrick (born 1990)
- Holly Kenny (born 1995)
- Skandar Keynes (born 1991)
- Imogen King (born 1996)
- Tommy Knight (born 1993)
- Emma Laird (born 1998)
- Lucien Laviscount (born 1992)
- Thomas Law (born 1992)
- Alex Lawther (born 1995)
- Dex Lee (born 1993)
- Gabriella Leon (born 1996)
- Jessie Mei Li (born 1995)
- Ricardo P. Lloyd (born 1993)
- Georgia Lock (born 1996)
- Bobby Lockwood (born 1993)
- Aisling Loftus (born 1990)
- Jessica Lord (born 1998)
- Lily Loveless (born 1990)
- George Mackay (born 1992)
- Emma Mackey (born 1996) (born in Le Mans, France)
- Jessica Madsen (born 1992)
- Madeleine Mantock (born 1990)
- Noah Marullo (born 1999)
- Abby Mavers (born 1990)
- Freya Mavor (born 1993)
- Lauren McCrostie (born 1996)
- Shona McGarty (born 1991)
- Katie McGlynn (born 1993)
- Mia McKenna-Bruce (born 1997)
- Jack McMullen (born 1991)
- Lauren McQueen (born 1996)
- Ross McLaren (born 1991)
- Danny Miller (born 1991)
- Nico Mirallegro (born 1991)
- Ambika Mod (born 1995/1996)
- Anjli Mohindra (born 1990)
- Olivia Morris (born 1997)
- Zack Morris (born 1998)
- Nadine Mulkerrin (born 1993)
- Ana Mulvoy-Ten (born 1992)

=== N–Z ===
- Rukku Nahar (born 1996)
- Mimi Ndiweni (born 1991) (British-Zimbabwean)
- Kassius Nelson (born 1997)
- Luke Newton (born 1993)
- Clair Norris (born 1997)
- Agnes O'Casey (born 1995/1996)
- Jack O'Connell (born 1990)
- Josh O'Connor (born 1990)
- Amara Okereke (born 1996)
- Vivian Oparah (born 1996)
- Harrison Osterfield (born 1996)
- Himesh Patel (born 1990)
- Chance Perdomo (1996–2024) (born in California)
- Alex Pettyfer (born 1990)
- Jessica Plummer (born 1992)
- Ned Porteous (born 1994)
- Joseph Potter (born 1997/98)
- Will Poulter (born 1993)
- Bel Powley (born 1992)
- Kathryn Prescott (born 1991)
- Megan Prescott (born 1991)
- Dominique Provost-Chalkley (born 1990)
- Florence Pugh (born 1996)
- Ella Purnell (born 1996)
- Joseph Quinn (born 1994)
- Toby Regbo (born 1991)
- Emily Reid (born 1998)
- Ted Reilly (born 1991)
- Archie Renaux (born 1997)
- Jordan Renzo (born 1993) (British-American)
- Sam Retford (born 1999) (born in Australia)
- Tanya Reynolds (born 1991)
- Dakota Blue Richards (born 1994)
- Maisie Richardson-Sellers (born 1992)
- Daisy Ridley (born 1992)
- Craig Roberts (born 1991)
- Jack Rowan (born 1997)
- Charlie Rowe (born 1996)
- Rebecca Ryan (born 1991)
- Lily Sacofsky (born 1994)
- Abubakar Salim (born 1993)
- Eliot Salt (born 1994)
- Banita Sandhu (born 1997)
- Paige Sandhu (born 1997)
- Rory J. Saper (born 1996)
- Alex Sawyer (born 1993)
- Kaya Scodelario (born 1992)
- Naomi Scott (born 1993)
- Anna Shaffer (born 1992)
- Rish Shah (born 1997)
- Tahirah Sharif (born 1993)
- Dominic Sherwood (born 1990)
- Sophie Simnett (born 1997)
- Marli Siu (born 1993)
- Sophie Skelton (born 1994)
- Harriet Slater (born 1994)
- Eugene Simon (born 1992)
- Joshua Sinclair-Evans (born 1995)
- Ella-Rae Smith (born 1998)
- Toby-Alexander Smith (born 1991)
- Ceallach Spellman (born 1995)
- Charlotte Spencer (born 1991)
- Savannah Steyn (born 1996)
- Sam Strike (born 1994)
- Oliver Stark (born 1991)
- Sophie Stuckey (born 1991)
- Harry Styles (born 1994)
- Jessica Sula (born 1994)
- Gregg Sulkin (born 1992) (naturalised American citizen)
- Amita Suman (born 1997) (born in Nepal)
- Connor Swindells (born 1996)
- Eden Taylor-Draper (born 1997)
- Aaron Taylor-Johnson (born 1990)
- Anya Taylor-Joy (born 1996) (born in Miami, Florida; British-Argentine)
- Sean Teale (born 1992)
- Thalissa Teixeira (born 1992/1993)
- Cara Theobold (born 1990)
- Abigail Thorn (born 1993)
- Freddie Thorp (born 1994)
- Eleanor Tomlinson (born 1992)
- Lily Travers (born 1990)
- Callum Turner (born 1990)
- Sophie Turner (born 1996)
- Sam Tutty (born 1998)
- Joanna Vanderham (born 1991)
- Charlotte Vega (born 1994) (born in Madrid, Spain)
- Hannah van der Westhuysen (born 1995)
- Joivan Wade (born 1993)
- Jordan Waller (born 1992)
- Barney Walsh (born 1997)
- Suki Waterhouse (born 1992)
- Emma Watson (born 1990) (born in Paris, France)
- Charlie Wernham (born 1994)
- Lydia West (born 1993)
- Fionn Whitehead (born 1997)
- Maisie Williams (born 1997)
- Rose Williams (born 1994)
- Kedar Williams-Stirling (born 1994)
- David Witts (born 1991)
- Jack Wolfe (born 1995)
- Aimee Lou Wood (born 1994)
- Carla Woodcock (born 1998)
- Bethan Wright (born 1996)
- Bonnie Wright (born 1991)
- Letitia Wright (born 1993) (born in Georgetown, Guyana)
- Kit Young (born 1994)
- Assad Zaman (born 1990)
- Milly Zero (born 1999)

== Born in the 2000s ==
- Lauryn Ajufo (born 2000)
- Freya Allan (born 2001)
- Isabelle Allen (born 2002)
- Jade Alleyne (born 2001)
- Joe Anders (born in 2003) (born in the U.S.)
- Jessie Mae Alonzo (born 2003)
- Louis Ashbourne Serkis (born 2004)
- Lily-Rose Aslandogdu (born 2003)
- Alex Bain (born 2001)
- Bukky Bakray (born 2002)
- Asha Banks (born 2003)
- Ruby Barnhill (born 2004)
- Meg Bellamy (born 2002)
- Rosie Bentham (born 2001)
- Harley Bird (born 2001)
- Caitlin Blackwood (born 2000)
- Isabella Blake-Thomas (born 2002)
- Millie Bobby Brown (born 2004) (born in Spain)
- Bobby Brazier (born 2003)
- Teo Briones (born 2005)
- Emily Carey (born 2003)
- Raffey Cassidy (born 2001)
- Earl Cave (born 2000)
- Kit Connor (born 2004)
- Owen Cooper (born 2009)
- Esmé Creed-Miles (born 2000)
- Sebastian Croft (born 2001)
- Amelia Crouch (born 2004)
- Cleo Demetriou (born 2001)
- Lino Facioli (born 2000)
- Georgie Farmer (born 2002)
- Spike Fearn (born 2000)
- Yasmin Finney (born 2003)
- Emily Flain (born 2003)
- Amelia Flanagan (born 2008)
- Jamie Flatters (born 2000)
- William Gao (born 2003)
- Millie Gibson (born 2004)
- Harry Gilby (born 2001)
- Ella Greenwood (born 2001)
- Jack Hollington (born 2001)
- Lucy Hutchinson (born 2003)
- Louis Hynes (born 2001)
- Millie Innes (born 2000)
- Emilia Jones (born 2002)
- Samuel Joslin (born 2002)
- Mia Jenkins (born 2000)
- Noah Jupe (born 2005)
- Alexander James Rodriguez (born 2007) (born in Spain)
- Dafne Keen (born 2005) (born in Spain)
- Lucia Keskin (born 2001)
- Conrad Khan (born 2000)
- Sophia Kiely (born 2000)
- Honor Kneafsey (born 2004)
- Lily Laight (born 2001)
- Bleu Landau (born 2005)
- Iris Law (born 2000)
- Ellie Leach (born 2001)
- Indy Lewis (born 2001)
- Sam Nivola (born 2003)
- Lewis MacDougall (born 2002)
- Ramona Marquez (born 2001)
- Bailey May (born 2002)
- Wilson Mbomio (born 2002)
- Isobelle Molloy (born 2000)
- Alexander Molony (born 2006)
- Elle Mulvaney (born 2002)
- Mya-Lecia Naylor (2002–2019)
- Safia Oakley-Green (born 2001)
- Brenock O'Connor (born 2000)
- Woody Norman (born 2009)
- Ruby O'Donnell (born 2000)
- Isabella Pappas (born 2002) (born in Italy)
- Milo Parker (born 2002)
- Nico Parker (born 2004)
- Louis Partridge (born 2003)
- Kia Pegg (born 2000)
- Molly Rainford (born 2000)
- Tilly Ramsay (born 2001)
- Bella Ramsey (born 2003)
- Lenny Rush (born 2009)
- Isabella Sermon (born 2006)
- Darci Shaw (born 2002)
- Mimi Slinger (born 2003)
- Tamara Smart (born 2005)
- Maisie Smith (born 2001)
- Isobel Steele (born 2000)
- Ruby Stokes (born 2000)
- Tom Taylor (born 2001)
- Ty Tennant (born 2002)
- Mia Threapleton (born 2000)
- Amir Wilson (born 2004)
- Lara Wollington (born 2003)
- Eleanor Worthington Cox (born 2001)
- Harry Collett (born 2004)
- Roman Griffin Davis (born 2007)
- Austin Haynes (born 2008 or 2009)
- Archie Yates (born 2009)

== Born in the 2010s ==
- Nykiya Adams (born 2012)
- Frankie Corio (born 2010)
- Matilda Firth (born 2014)
- Rocco Haynes (born 2013)
- Jude Hill (born 2010)
- Jacobi Jupe (born 2013)
- Eve Ridley (born 2011)
- Amelie Bea Smith (born 2011)
- Arabella Stanton (born 2014)
- Indica Watson (born 2010)
- Alfie Williams (born 2011)

== Unknown birthdate ==
- Vivienne Acheampong
- Laura Benson
- Robert Boulter
- Phoebe Campbell
- Burt Caesar
- Lu Corfield
- Brian Cowan
- Gabrielle Creevy
- Rachel Davies
- Anni Domingo
- Bart Edwards
- Ray Fearon
- Daniel Francis
- Kevin Howarth
- Shebz Miah
- Leonora Moore
- Helen Noble
- Travis Oliver
- Rob Ostlere
- June Page
- Jenny Rainsford
- Georgina Redhead
- Isabelle Smith
- Karla-Simone Spence
- Trevor Thomas
- Michael Thomson
- Imogen Toner
- Micheal Ward
- Eve White
- Toby Williams
- T-Bone Wilson

== See also ==
- Lists of actors
- Lists of British people
- List of English actors
- List of Scottish actors
- List of Welsh actors
- List of actors from Northern Ireland
- Cinema of the United Kingdom
- Independent cinema in the United Kingdom
- Radio in the United Kingdom
- Television in the United Kingdom
- Theatre of the United Kingdom
- List of Academy Award winners and nominees from Great Britain
