= Holbrook (name) =

Holbrook is a masculine given name and a surname. It may refer to:

== Surname ==
- Amory Holbrook (1820–1866), American attorney and politician in the Oregon Territory
- Andrew Dillon Mason Holbrook (Born 1992), OEF U.S.Army Veteran
- Ann Catherine Holbrook (1780–1837), British actress and writer
- Anna Kathryn Holbrook (born 1957), American soap opera actress
- Bill Holbrook (born 1958), American comic strip artist
- Boyd Holbrook (born 1980 or 1981), American film and television actor
- Chad Holbrook (born 1971), American college baseball coach
- Charles R. Holbrook III (born 1938), American politician
- David Holbrook (1923–2011), British writer
- Eddie Holbrook (fl. 1964–1982), American former college men's basketball head coach
- Edward Dexter Holbrook (1836–1870), a congressional delegate from the Idaho Territory
- Elizabeth Bradford Holbrook (1913–2009), Canadian portrait sculptor
- Florence Holbrook (1860–1932), American educator, writer, pacifist
- Frank Kinney Holbrook (c. 1874–1916), first African-American intercollegiate athlete at the University of Iowa
- Frederick Holbrook (1813–1909), American politician and 27th Governor of Vermont
- Hal Holbrook (1925–2021), American actor
- Henry Holbrook (1820–1902), English-born merchant and politician in British Columbia
- Jarita Holbrook (born 1965), American astronomer
- John Holbrook (bishop) (born 1962), Anglican bishop
- John Holbrook (publisher) (1761–1838), American publisher and entrepreneur
- John Edwards Holbrook (1796–1871), American zoologist, herpetologist, physician and naturalist
- Joseph Holbrook (1806–1885), Mormon pioneer in Utah
- Josiah Holbrook (1788–1854), founder of the Lyceum movement in the United States
- Julian Holbrook (1897–1980), British Army brigadier
- Justin Holbrook (born 1976), Australian rugby league head coach
- Karen Holbrook (born 1942), former president of Ohio State University
- Leonard Holbrook (1882–1974), British Royal Navy rear admiral, brother of Norman Douglas Holbrook
- Lucius Roy Holbrook (1875–1952), American major general
- Martin Luther Holbrook (1831–1902), American physician and health activist
- Norman Douglas Holbrook (1888–1976), British Royal Navy commander and recipient of the Victoria Cross, brother of Leonard Holbrook
- Percy Holbrook (1859–1946), British priest
- Rick Holbrook (1948–2007), American Olympic weightlifter
- Sam Holbrook (born 1965), Major League Baseball umpire
- Sammy Holbrook (1910–1991), Major League Baseball catcher
- Steve Holbrook (born 1952), English former footballer
- Stewart Holbrook (1893–1964), American writer
- Teri Holbrook (fl. 1995-present), American mystery writer
- Terry Holbrook (born 1945), English football referee
- Terry Holbrook (ice hockey) (born 1950), Canadian former ice hockey player
- Thomas Holbrook (born 1949), American politician
- Willard Ames Holbrook Jr. (1898–1986), American major general

== Given name ==
- Holbrook Blinn (1872–1928), American stage and film actor
- Holbrook Gaskell (1813–1909), British industrialist
- Holbrook Jackson (1874–1948), British journalist, writer and publisher
- Holbrook Working (1895–1985), American professor of economics and statistics at Stanford University's Food Research Institute
