= Mulheron =

Mulheron is a surname. Notable people with the surname include:

- Ashley Mulheron (born 1983), Scottish actress and television presenter
- Danny Mulheron, New Zealand actor and television director
- Eddie Mulheron (1942–2015), Scottish footballer
- Tiffany Mulheron (born 1984), Scottish actress
