= Mary Woffington =

Irish actress and socialite (1729–1811)

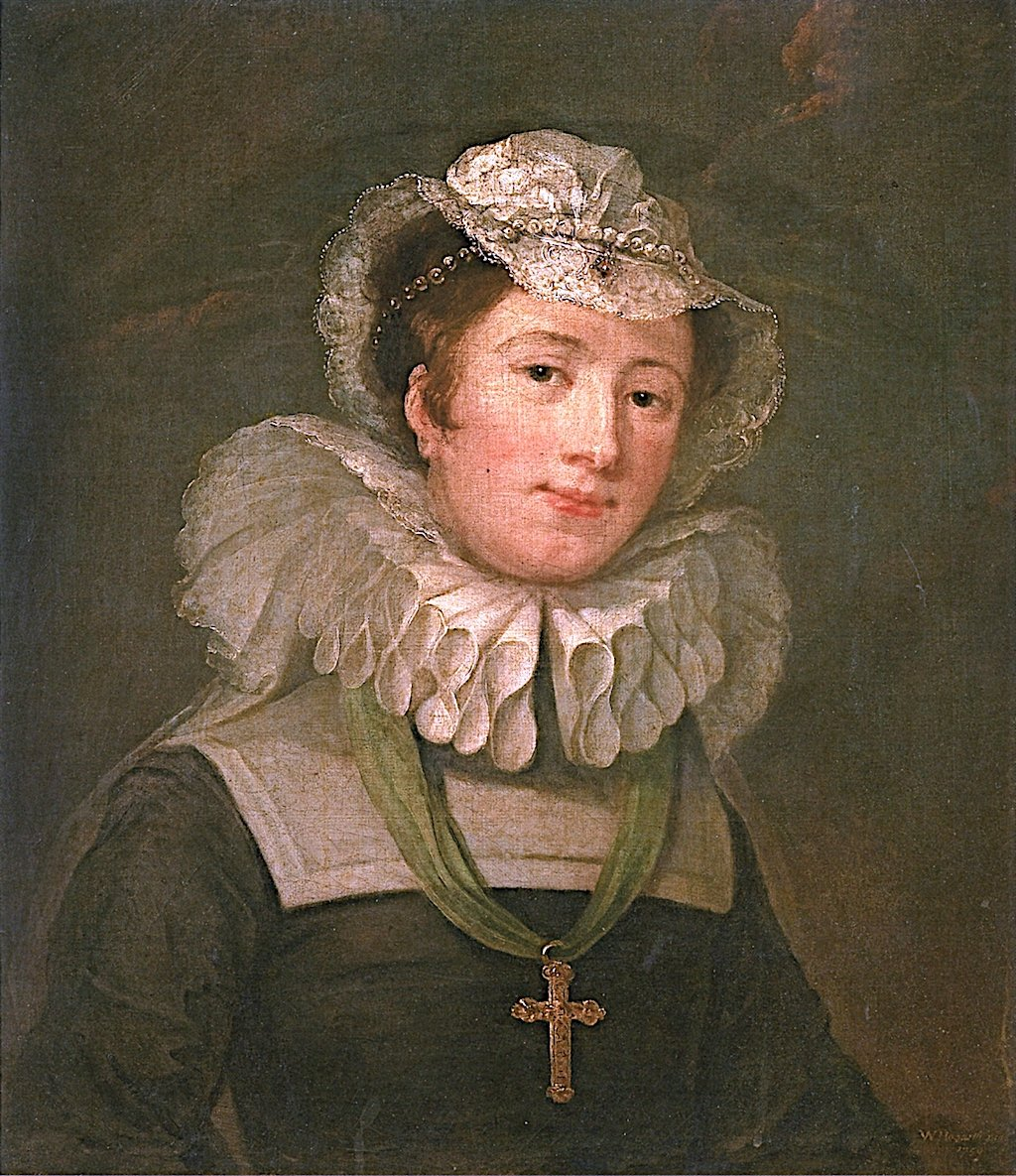
- Portrait by William Hogarth, 1759
- Born: Mary Woffington; 1729; Dublin, Kingdom of Ireland
- Died: 4 April 1811 (aged 81–82); England
- Occupations: Socialite; actor
- Era: Georgian
- Spouse: Robert Cholmondeley (m. 1746; died 1804)
- Children: 10
- Relatives: Peg Woffington (sister); George Cholmondeley, 3rd Earl of Cholmondeley (father-in-law); Horace Walpole (uncle-in-law)

Mary Woffington Cholmondeley (1729 – 4 April 1811) was an Irish socialite of the Georgian era. Her sister was the famous actor Peg Woffington. After a failed attempt at an acting career, Mary married the second son of the Earl of Cholmondeley and chose to live as a socialite. With connections in both English and French high society, she came to have a "modest salon", and was close friends with Frances Burney and Samuel Johnson.

== Early life and acting career ==
Mary Woffington was born in Dublin, Ireland, in 1729. She was nicknamed Polly, and was the second daughter of Catholic bricklayer Arthur or John Woffington and his wife Hannah. Mary's older sister Margaret "Peg" Woffington would later become a successful stage actor in Ireland and England. Little is known about Mary's youth but it is likely she had minor roles in her sister's productions, including nearly 100 performances of The Beggar's Opera at New Booth Theatre, Dublin. Her father died when she was young, and she remained in Ireland with her mother while her sister pursued an acting career in England. Woffington joined her sister in London in 1740. On 20 April 1741, Mary had a minor role as a child dancer in a performance of The Double Gallant at Covent Garden Theatre. Later that year, Peg funded Mary's education at a Catholic convent school in Paris.

In mid 1744, aged 15, Woffington returned to England and moved into her sister's country house at Teddington, where she began courting members of the local gentry. During this period, Mary determined to become an actor like her sister and fortune-tellers predicted a successful career. Peg, with the help of David Garrick, Richard Brinsley Sheridan, George Anne Bellamy and others, aided Mary by staging a practice performance of The Distrest Mother at Teddington. Mary's professional debut occurred on 30 March 1745, when she performed the role of the maidservant Cherry in The Beaux' Stratagem at Drury Lane Theatre. Her performance was mediocre, though critics and audience were "indulgent" and "courteous". After this, Mary lost interest in acting and did not take to the stage again.

== Life as a socialite ==
Following her brief acting career, Mary Woffington returned to Teddington and continued to court the local gentry. By mid 1746, she courted Robert Cholmondeley, a disgraced (Note: According to James Boswell, Robert "was an ensign in the guards, and at the Battle of Fontenoy (11 May 1745) fairly hid himself, for which he was disgracefully broke at the head of the army".) captain in the 3rd Foot Guards and the second son of George Cholmondeley, 3rd Earl of Cholmondeley. The couple married on 30 November 1746 at St Anne's Church, Soho, without the approval of either of their families. The marriage was initially opposed by Earl Cholmondeley and Horace Walpole, Robert's maternal uncle. In a letter to the Duke of Newcastle, the already-impoverished Earl Cholmondeley wrote the marriage had alarmed his creditors, forcing him to sell much of his remaining property. Walpole wrote to Sir Horace Mann: "My family has just undergone a severe trial: my nephew has married the sister of a play-actress", and stated the marriage threatened to ruin the Cholmondeley family. Upon meeting Woffington, however, Walpole was charmed by "her beauty, grace, and wit", and he insisted on introducing her to the Dauphin of France. Earl Cholmondeley was convinced by Peg, who said: "My lord, I have much more reason to be offended at it than your lordship, for I had before but one beggar to maintain, and now I have two", because the couple lived in a house in Westminster that Peg rented and furnished.

Historian Ethna Byrne-Costigan describes Mary Woffington as:

more beautiful than her sister ... as vivacious as she was playful in her conversation. Lively, amusing, full of life, she succeeded in attracting people. Well fitted to fascinate those she moved among, she could be serious, grave, even austere when she judged such an attitude necessary to win a good opinion for herself. Above all she excelled in subtle flattery, not going out of her way to be complimentary, but it was quite natural, quite uncalculating. On every possible occasion when she was with friends she would praise the absent.

Woffington was quickly welcomed into high society, becoming close friends with Frances Burney and Samuel Johnson. Through Johnson, she became associated with other members of The Club, including Oliver Goldsmith and Sir Joshua Reynolds, frequently dining at Reynolds's house. She became acquainted with "scholars, artists, bluestockings, and clergymen". Woffington was popular in London drawing rooms for her "engaging personality and quick intelligence", as well as her connections in theatrical and intellectual circles, and she came to have a "modest salon". Woffington was a frequent subject of Walpole's letters; he squired her in France and introduced her to Madame du Deffand, who in turn sponsored her in Parisian high society. After spending a year in France, Woffington became disinterested in high society, preferring to be "in the company of artists, actors, and literary folk". She and Johnson maintained their close friendship until his death in 1784.

According to Byrne-Costigan, Woffington's husband "adored her and treated her like a spoiled child". After leaving the army, he declared himself a "man of peace" and became a priest in the Church of England. Through his family, he was able to acquire two church livings in Hertfordshire, which allowed the couple to financially prosper. In addition, he was appointed to the lay office Auditor-General of the Revenues of America. Woffington and her husband were also able to acquire wealth through their family's wills. As Peg's designated heir, Woffington received the majority of her sister's property after her death in 1760. Through Walpole's will, she and her family received £1,500 while Earl Cholmondeley, whose finances had partly recovered, made her sons residual legatees of some properties in London in his will.

== Children and death ==
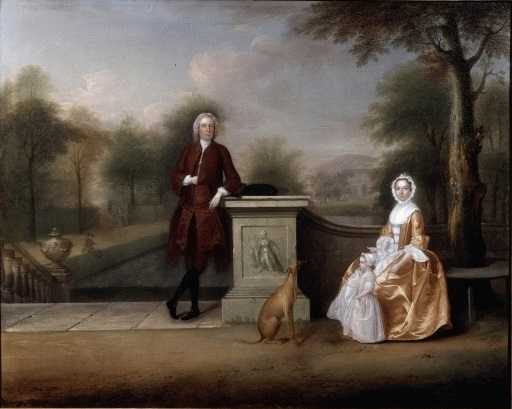
Painting of Woffington and her family by Arthur Devis, c. 1750

Woffington and Cholmondeley had nine children together, though there are conflicting accounts of how many survived into adulthood. Byrne-Costigan states eight of the nine "made splendid marriages", while according to Philip H. Highfill and John Doran, only four and five, respectively, survived past infancy. Of these five, three died relatively young; one daughter Henrietta Maria died as a child sometime after 1760, another daughter was killed in a carriage accident at Leatherhead in 1806 while serving as lady-in-waiting for Crown Princess Caroline of Brunswick, and their second son Robert Francis travelled to the East Indies in 1772 and died there on 29 April 1777. Of the two remaining known children, their daughter Hester Frances married Sir William Bellingham and their eldest son George James Cholmondeley was married three times; his fathers-in-law were John Pitt of Encombe, Sir Philip Francis, and John Townshend, 2nd Viscount Sydney.

Robert Cholmondeley died on 6 June 1804. Mary Woffington died in England on 4 April 1811 following a long illness, outliving her sister by 51 years. In her will, Woffington ensured her son George was "amply provided for" and transferred all of the property she received in her sister's will to her daughter Hester.

Mary Woffington is a character in the stage play Pretty Peggy, which was written in 1902 by Frances Aymar Mathews and is based on the life of Woffington's sister. Among the actors who portrayed Mary are Lucile Gleason, Mabel Van Buren, Evelyn D'Alroy, and Margaret Mayo.
