= Fawsitt =

Fawsitt is a surname. Notable people with the surname include:

- Amy Fawsitt (1836–1876), English actress
- Dylan Fawsitt (born 1990), Irish-American rugby union player

== See also ==
- Fawcett (surname)
