= Halbrook =

Halbrook is a surname. Notable people with the surname include:

- Brad Halbrook, American politician
- Stephen Halbrook (born 1947), American lawyer and gun rights advocate
- Swede Halbrook (1933–1988), American basketball player

== See also ==
- Holbrook (name)
