= Lesbian Vampire Killers =

2009 film by Phil Claydon

- Theatrical release poster
- Directed by: Phil Claydon
- Written by: Stewart Williams; Paul Hupfield
- Produced by: Steve Clark-Hall
- Starring: James Corden; Mathew Horne; MyAnna Buring; Vera Filatova; Silvia Colloca; Paul McGann; Emer Kenny
- Cinematography: David Higgs
- Edited by: James Herbert
- Music by: Debbie Wiseman
- Production companies: Alliance Films; Velvet Bite; AV Pictures
- Distributed by: Momentum Pictures
- Release dates: 16 March 2009 (SXSW); 20 March 2009 (United Kingdom)
- Running time: 87 minutes
- Country: United Kingdom
- Language: English
- Box office: $3.6 million

Lesbian Vampire Killers is a 2009 British comedy horror film directed by Phil Claydon and written by Stewart Williams and Paul Hupfield. The film stars James Corden and Mathew Horne, with MyAnna Buring, Vera Filatova, Silvia Colloca and Paul McGann in supporting roles.

== Plot ==
Jimmy and Fletch are two friends living in London. Jimmy is dumped by his unscrupulous girlfriend, while Fletch is fired from his job as a clown for punching a child. They decide to escape their woes and hike to a remote village in Norfolk that they find on an old map. As they approach a pub in the village, with Jimmy upset about Fletch destroying his phone, they see a number of foreign female history students leaving.

Hoping to find more women inside, they are greeted by a morose crowd of men and approached by a seemingly crazed vicar who believes Jimmy is a long-lost descendant of a local vampire slayer. They learn the students are going to a cottage to stay the night. Jimmy and Fletch pursue the students' van, catching up to it as the engine has broken down, and are introduced to Heidi, Lotte, Anke and Trudi. They are invited to join a party on the van.

The group arrives at their destination, only to learn that a curse rests over the village: every female child turns into a lesbian vampire on her 18th birthday. There is an old legend stating that the Vampire Queen, Carmilla, descended on the village during the night of a blood moon, killed its menfolk and seduced its women to her evil. When the ruler of the land, Baron Wolfgang Mclaren (Jimmy's ancestor) returned from the Crusades, he discovered one of the women was his wife, Eva. The baron forged a sacred sword, then defeated Carmilla. Before dying, Carmilla cursed the village. When the blood of the last of Mclaren's bloodline mixes with a virgin girl's blood, Carmilla will be resurrected.

Fletch and Jimmy spend the night with the women. Heidi and Anke are turned into vampires. After Lotte insists that the others try to find her missing friends, they witness Trudi being turned. Eva, Carmilla's mistress, tries to draw Lotte to her growing clan of lesbian vampires. The trio returns to the cottage after killing Heidi and Anke and barricade themselves inside after the vampires destroy the van. Jimmy's ex-girlfriend Judi arrives at the door and Jimmy, unwilling to give up on the relationship, takes her into the bedroom. Lotte reveals to Fletch that she is a virgin and wants to sleep with Jimmy.

The vicar researches the vampire slayer who killed Carmilla before arming himself and setting off to find Jimmy. Judi reveals herself to be a vampire, and after a struggle, Fletch and Jimmy kill her. The vampires approach the cottage and Jimmy inadvertently invites them in. Eva discovers that Jimmy is the descendant of the baron who killed Carmilla and that Lotte is a virgin and kidnaps them.

The vicar saves Fletch from Trudi and tells Fletch the truth about the village and Jimmy's identity. They go after Jimmy and Lotte in the vicar's crucifix-covered car. As the vampires prepare to sacrifice Lotte and Jimmy, Fletch and the vicar try to recover the Sword of Daeldo, the sword that killed Carmilla, from the baron's tomb. While Fletch works to open the tomb, the vicar checks on his daughter Rebecca, but does not notice that she has been turned. Rebecca attempts to seduce Fletch. When she attacks him, she is inadvertently impaled on the sword. Fletch decides not to tell the vicar what happened.

At Carmilla's tomb, Lotte reveals her love for Jimmy. The vampires begin draining their blood to resurrect Carmilla. With the sword, Fletch and the vicar drive to Carmilla's tomb. When they enter the woods, they bring various weapons, but forget the sword. The pair reach Jimmy and Lotte. The vicar releases them, but Carmilla is resurrected. The vicar sacrifices himself so the others can get back to the car for the sword. Eva separates Lotte from the men, attacking and seducing her. Lotte fights back while Fletch and Jimmy fetch weapons. Lotte kills Eva with her cross necklace, infuriating Carmilla. Fletch tries to kill Carmilla before Lotte is turned, but is captured himself. Jimmy saves them by hurling the sword at Carmilla, piercing her heart and destroying her. The three survivors decide to continue ridding the world of evil.

== Cast ==
- James Corden as Fletch
- Mathew Horne as Jimmy
- Paul McGann as The Vicar
- Emer Kenny as Rebecca, the Vicar's daughter
- Lucy Gaskell as Judy
- Louise Dylan as Anke
- Ashley Mulheron as Trudi
- Tiffany Mulheron as Heidi
- Vera Filatova as Eva
- Silvia Colloca as Carmilla
- MyAnna Buring as Lotte
- Emma Clifford as Ms. Rossi
- Margarita Hall as Daughter of darkness
- John Pierce Jones as Landlord

== Production ==
=== Background ===
The film was originally planned to be filmed on a very small budget, with writers Hupfield and Williams as director and star, respectively. AV Pictures became attached to the project, and when they ran into difficulty securing funding they offered Phil Claydon the role of director. Claydon then approached James Corden to play one of the lead roles after seeing him in The History Boys. Corden later sent Claydon a pre-release copy of Gavin & Stacey, which convinced him to cast Mathew Horne as co-star. The film was stuck in development hell for several years until the newly reformed Hammer Film Productions company expressed interest in the project, which convinced AV Pictures to move forward with production to avoid losing the film.

Principal photography began in 2008. Claydon described the film as influenced by Ghostbusters with a mix of monster movies by Hammer Horror and the Universal Monsters. Referring to the special effects used in the film he said "I covered James in vampire gunk at every opportunity because that made me laugh", since the Vampires turn into slime rather than dust or bursting into flames like other vampire stories.

=== Location ===
Lesbian Vampire Killers is set in Norfolk, based around the village of Cranwich which is portrayed in the film as Cragwich, but was filmed outside London on location at Luton Hoo in Bedfordshire and in Three Mills film studios in Bromley-by-Bow.

The film is a tongue-in-cheek homage to the classic Hammer Horror films and was once slated to be the first "new" Hammer film. This did not come to pass and it was ultimately Alliance and Momentum Pictures along with AV Films who produced the project.

== Critical reception ==
Reviews of the film were largely negative. Lesbian Vampire Killers holds a 28% approval rating on review aggregator Rotten Tomatoes, based on 25 reviews with an average rating of 4.1/10. The website's critics consensus reads: "Lesbian Vampire Killers stakes a claim to niche British humor, but ultimately succumbs to dreary twaddle."

James Christopher of The Times described Lesbian Vampire Killers as "profoundly awful" stating it is an "instantly forgettable lads' mag farce" and claimed the film was an "appalling waste of a perfectly decent title". Allan Hunter of the Daily Express called it "badly written and hastily executed" and "takes all the easy options of bad taste, bosoms and body fluids". Anthony Quin writing in The Independent gave the film 1 star out of 5, describing it as woeful and stating that Horne and Corden had "overstretched their appeal" and looked "in danger" of becoming today's Hale and Pace. Peter Bradshaw of The Guardian described the film as "mostly pretty awful, but there are one or two crass laughs."

Nicholas Yanes of Scifipulse.net found Lesbian Vampire Killers to be a great "B Movie" worth becoming a cult classic.

== Legacy ==
Whilst on the comedy panel show The King is Dead in September 2010 James Corden commented that watching the film would be too harsh a punishment for prisoners being held at Guantanamo Bay and that it was "a pile of shit."

In a 2013 interview with The Guardian, Corden described the film as "quite embarrassing". In 2019 Corden discussed his self-described “questionable film career" on his talk show and told audience members who had not seen the film that "it's exactly as bad as you think it is!"

The film was highlighted by film critic I.Q. Hunter as a particularly poor example of a modern exploitation film in his 2013 book British Trash Cinema. Hunter argued that the film's inherent sexism is “more reactionary than Hammer’s fantasies of dangerously sexy women; the film’s trashiness, which supposedly inoculates it against sexism by ironing masculinity, allows it to celebrate rather than subvert the stereotypes it so knowingly pastiches.”

== Accolades ==
=== Awards ===
- San Sebastian Horror Festival: Audience Award for Best Feature Film (2009)

=== Nominations ===
- International Film Music Critics Association: Best Original Score for a Comedy Film – Debbie Wiseman (2009)

== Home media ==
Lesbian Vampire Killers was released on DVD and Blu-ray on 3 August 2009. Momentum Pictures claimed retailers – including supermarket chain Tesco – demanded warning stickers be placed over the word "Lesbian". A spokesperson from Tesco said that although they did ask for a cover with less cleavage, they "did not suggest that they [Momentum] amend the wording".

In the United States, the film was released on DVD as Vampire Killers on 29 December 2009 by The Weinstein Company.

As part of its 12 Days of Christmas free giveaway, iTunes made the film available to download for 24 hours on New Year's Eve 2009.
