= Charles R. Holbrook III =

American politician

Member of the Kentucky House of Representatives from the 100th district
- In office 1972–1986

Personal details
- Born: September 1938 (age 87) Ashland, Kentucky, U.S.
- Party: Republican

Charles R. Holbrook III (born September 1938) was an American politician in the state of Kentucky. He served in the Kentucky House of Representatives as a Republican from 1972 to 1988.
