= Florence Holbrook =

American writer

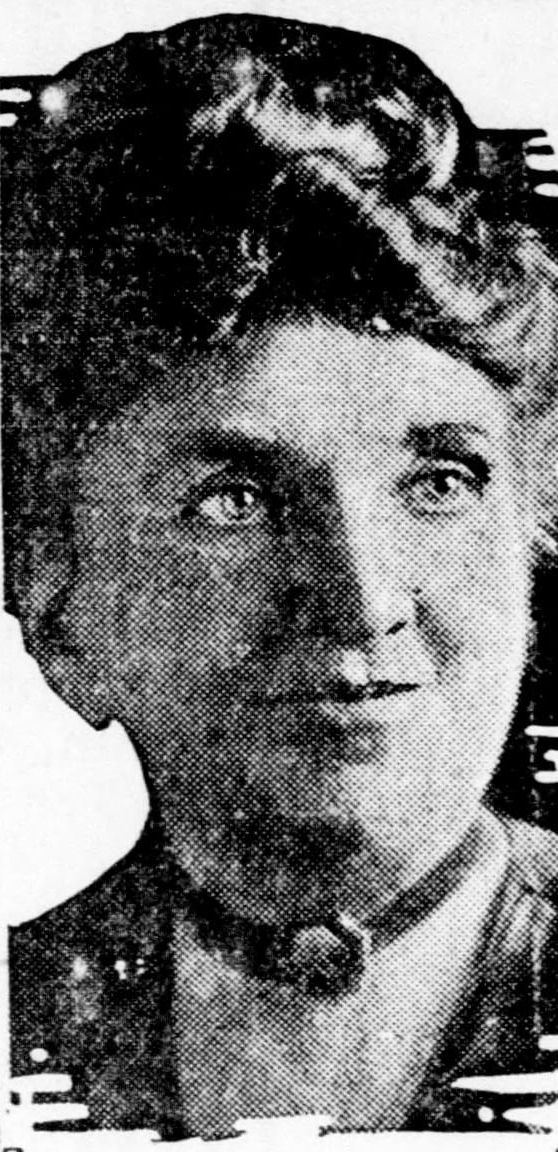
- Florence Holbrook, from a 1921 newspaper
- Born: May 30, 1860; Peru, Illinois
- Died: September 28, 1932 (aged 72); Chicago
- Occupations: Writer, educator, peace and suffrage activist

Florence Holbrook (May 30, 1860 – September 28, 1932) was an American writer, educator, suffragist, and peace activist. She taught in the Chicago schools for over fifty years, and was an American delegate to the International Congress of Women in 1915, at the Hague, and in 1919, in Zürich. She was also aboard the Peace Ship with Rosika Schwimmer, and part of John Dewey's commission to study Soviet education in 1929.

== Early life and education ==
Holbrook was born in Peru, Illinois and raised in Joliet, the daughter of Edmund S. Holbrook and Anne Case Holbrook. Her father was a judge and an abolitionist. She earned a bachelor's degree in 1879 and a master's degree in 1885, from the University of Chicago (then known as Chicago University).

== Career ==
=== Education ===
Holbrook worked in the Chicago public schools for over fifty years, as a high school teacher of Greek and Latin, and later as a school principal. She was known for promoting arts in the schools, and leading student trips to the Art Institute of Chicago. She was president of the Chicago chapter of the Illinois State Teachers' Association. In 1908 she traveled in Europe and Great Britain studying schools, especially student-produced music and crafts. Her work gained particular national attention when her elementary-age students performed in a production of John Milton's masque Comus, an unusual and challenging text for schoolchildren. In 1929, she accompanied John Dewey to study education in the Soviet Union. She retired from teaching in 1929.

=== Peace ===
"Florence Holbrook is a woman who is not interested in educational work alone," commented a 1895 newspaper article; "she is strong enough to be interested in all that affects humanity." She was a member of the Chicago Peace Society, Chicago Political Equity League. She was a member of the American delegation to the International Congress of Women at The Hague in 1915, and in 1916 she joined the Peace Ship Expedition led by Rosika Schwimmer, and she managed Schwimmer's American lecture tour. In 1919, she was again a delegate to the International Congress of Women, when it met in Zürich.

== Publications ==
Holbrook wrote books for classroom use, often about mythology and folklore subjects. "Holbrook has a theory that if children hear the best of literature from the beginning of their education they will never wish for any other," explained a 1895 newspaper profile.

- 'Round the Year in Myth and Song (1897)
- The Hiawatha Primer (1898)
- From Many Lands: A Third Reader (1901, with Mary Frances Hall)
- Elementary Geography (1901)
- The Book of Nature Myths (1902)
- Northland Heroes (1909)
- Hiawatha Alphabet (1910, illustrated by H. D. Pohl)
- Cave, Mound, and Lake Dwellers (1911)
- Dramatic Reader for Lower Grades (1911)
- "To the Teachers of All the World" (1915, with Kate Blake and Grace deGraff)
- Every-day Speller (1917, with M. V. O'Shea and William Adalbert Cook)
- "The Teacher" (1924)

== Personal life ==
Holbrook died in 1932, at the age of 72. There are photos of Holbrook in the Schwimmer-Lloyd Collection, and a box of Holbrook's scrapbooks, at the New York Public Library. Her books, all of them now in the public domain, are still reprinted and sold. In 1983, columnist James J. Kilpatrick wrote about Holbrook's work as a principal.
