= Susan Galton =

English singer and actress (1849–1918)

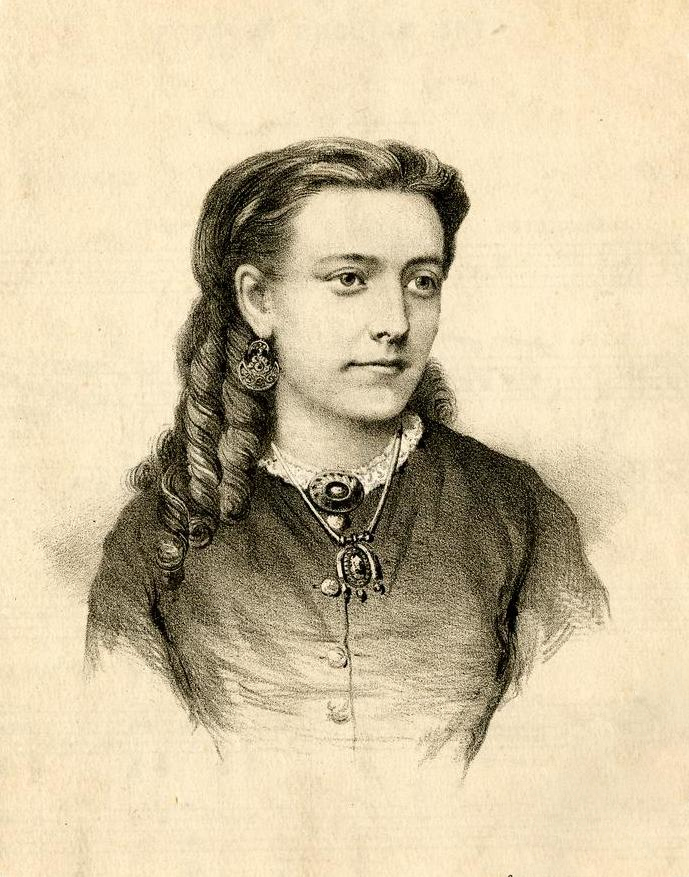
- Born: 22 September 1845
- Died: 18 April 1918 (aged 72)
- Relatives: Blanche Whiffen (sister); Louisa Pyne (aunt)

Susan Galton, also known by her married name Susan Kelleher, (22 September 1845 – 18 April 1918) was a British actress and operatic soprano. She was the niece of fellow soprano Louisa Pyne.

== Career ==
The daughter of opera singer Mary Ann Pyne and her husband Joseph West Galton, Susan Galton was born in England on 22 September 1845. Her aunt was soprano Louisa Pyne, and her sister was the actress and opera singer Blanche Whiffen (nee Galton). She received her early musical training from her mother. She studied singing with Delphine Ugalde in Paris and Francesco Schira in London.

In 1864 Galton became a member of William Harrison's opera company. She made her professional opera debut with this organization at Her Majesty's Theatre on December 5, 1864 as Amina in an English-language production of Bellini's La sonnambula. The cast also included George Honey as Alessio. A review of her performance in The Evening Herald questioned whether she was too young to begin performing in public, but stated that "nevertheless, Miss Susan Galton is possessed of a very rare ability, and promises to reach a high point, if not the highest, in her profession."

In September 1865, Galton appeared in a production of Castle Grim alongside George Honey and Fanny Reeves.

In 1865, Galton performed as the lead soprano with a theatre company. The company performing various operas and ballets at the Theatre Royal in Leeds, including La sonnambula, Bohemian Girl, Satanella, Faust, and Maritana.

On February 17, 1870 she married Alfred Kelleher in Philadelphia.

Galton died in Philadelphia, Pennsylvania on 18 April 1918 at the age of 72.
