= Louisa Faye =

British actress

Louisa Faye (born 1989 in Gravesend) is a British actress.

== Early life ==
Louisa Faye lived with both her parents, Tony and Lyn in Bean Kent, until they divorced when Louisa was young. She has one half-brother, Spencer, who is a director of Prime Direct Distribution. Her mother re-married in 2006 to Brian Matthews, a senior lecturer at Goldsmiths, University of London. From that marriage Faye has two step-brothers, Mark and Robert.

Faye attended Bean Primary School and then Dartford Grammar School for Girls. She was accepted into the National Youth Theatre in 2006 and achieved a BA Hons Degree in Acting at the prestigious Royal Welsh College of Music and Drama, Cardiff.

== Career ==
Faye was cast in the feature film 'The Bandit Hound' in Los Angeles, 2015. She starred alongside Judd Nelson (Breakfast Club/Empire), Lou Ferrigno (Original Hulk), Paul Sorvino, Joe Flanigan (Star Gate). Faye starred in the short film 'How to Be Lonely & Depressed' in Los Angeles 2015. Faye was in the cast of How's The World Treating You? at the Union Theatre, London, in 2012.
