= Maria Keogh =

Irish actress, playwright, musician

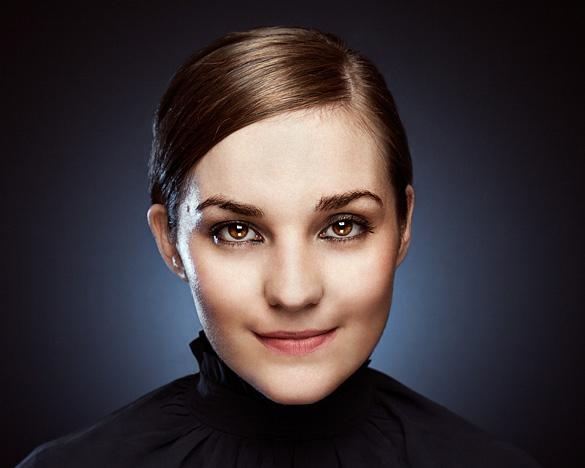
- Born: Maria Anastacia Keogh; 17 October 1982 (age 43); County Mayo, Ireland
- Occupations: Actress, playwright, musician
- Awards: Best Irish Actress Yew Tree Award

Maria Anastacia Keogh (born 17 October 1982) is an Irish former playwright, musician, educator and actress.

She wrote her first play A Change of Heart in 2008. The play was based on a modern-day story of Saint Francis of Assisi and she staged it in the Town Hall Theatre, Galway, to help raise funds for the Franciscan Abbey Church Roof Restoration Fund. After receiving a warm response from her first production she went to write and direct her next play, William Shakespeare's Contemporary Mix. The play was a story about the playwright William Shakespeare. He falls asleep and awakes in a dream. A humorous Pixie introduces Shakespeare to some of his best play characters from Hamlet to Macbeth.

She has composed music for many productions and the feature film, The Doubleganger. Keogh was also a member of a band up until September 2018. She helped launch an EP, "Flying Through the Ash", in August 2010 and held a charity concert in the Town Hall Theatre, Galway, for St Vincent de Paul.

She was elected a governor for the National University Ireland, Galway, and was nominated as a member of the NUI Senate.

== Filmography ==
Year	Movie	Role
2007	Waiting for Dublin	Swing Dancer
2010	Hardy Bucks	Princess Venice
2010	The Doubleganger	Angelina
2013	Feinmharu	Diane Keaton
