= Martin Parr (actor) =

British actor and director (born 1970)

Martin Parr (born 1970) is a British actor and director, best known for his work in the British theatre.

== Life and career ==
Parr trained as an actor and his work includes the West End productions of Woman In Mind, with Janie Dee, directed by Alan Ayckbourn at the Vaudeville Theatre, Maddie directed by Martin Connor, Time and the Conways with Penelope Keith and Pygmalion with Roy Marsden. His other works include most repertory theatres in the UK. Parr also made several guest appearances for the BBC including Tchaikovsky, Casualty and Doctors and toured the US several times including with Actors from the London Stage.

Direction includes a production of Comus for the London Handel Festival, significant work at the Rose Theatre, London, the Casa Da Música in Porto, Ambronay Festival in France, Handel House in London, and has worked on contemporary and classic texts, musical theatre, opera and staged oratorios.

His work has also involved working with students at the Royal Academy of Dramatic Art and the Royal Central School of Speech and Drama.

Parr was nominated for the 2013 Offie for Best Director - Hamlet.
