= Jarita Holbrook =

American astronomer

Jarita C. Holbrook
- Born: 1965 (age 59–60); Honolulu, Hawaii
- Education: Caltech (B.S. Physics, 1987); San Diego State University (M.S. Astronomy, 1992); University of California, Santa Cruz(Ph.D. Astronomy & Astrophysics,1997)
- Known for: Cultural Astronomy; Astronomy; Astrophysics; African Indigenous Astronomy
- Awards: Jury Prize The Art of Brooklyn Film Festival for Black Suns
- Scientific career
- Fields: Cultural Astronomy, History of Astronomy, Astronomy, Astrophysics
- Institutions: UCLA (1998 - 2001) Postdoc; United States Naval Academy (Aug 1999 - November 1999) Visiting; Colgate University(Oct 1998 - Jan 1999) Visiting; University of Arizona; Max-Planck-Institut für Wissenschaftsgeschichte Postdoc; University of the Western Cape(Present)
- Thesis: An Examination of the Composition and Structural Features of GL 2136 and Orion Bn-Kl Single Versus Cluster Star Formation (1997)
- Doctoral advisor: David M. Rank

Jarita Charmian Holbrook is an American astronomer and associate professor of physics at the University of the Western Cape (UWC) where she is principal investigator of the Astronomy & Society group. Holbrook's work examines the relationship between humans and the night sky, and she has produced scientific publications on cultural astronomy, starburst galaxies, and star formation regions.

== Early life and education ==
Jarita Holbrook was born in 1965 in Honolulu, Hawaii and grew up in San Bernardino and Los Angeles, California. Holbrook comes from a family of academics: her grandparents, James and Mary Holbrook, were both professors at Alcorn State University, her aunt, Edna Holbrook, is an assistant professor in the Mathematics department at Jackson State University and both of her parents obtained science degrees.

Holbrook studied physics at California Institute of Technology (Caltech) and earned a B.S. in 1987. After completing her undergraduate studies, Holbrook (RPCV) did their Peace Corps service as a science teacher in Fiji at the Ratu Navula Secondary School. She then continued her physics education at San Diego State University leading to an M.S. in Astronomy in 1992. After completing her M.S., she worked at the NASA Goddard Space Flight Center. Holbrook received her PhD in Astronomy and Astrophysics from the University of California, Santa Cruz in 1997 where she investigated star formation efficiency in the infrared focusing on Orion BN-kl and GL 2136.

== Career ==
Post-PhD, Holbrook shifted focus to the interdisciplinary field of cultural astronomy and she began laying the foundation for encouraging research on African Indigenous Astronomy. During this time, Holbrook worked at UCLA's Center for the Cultural Studies of Science, Technology, and Medicine as an NSF Minority Postdoctoral Fellow with Sharon Traweek. She also did postdoctoral work at the Max Planck Institute for the History of Science.

After completing her postdoctoral work, Holbrook took a position at the University of Arizona in the Bureau of Applied Research in Anthropology. Her work examined indigenous African astronomy and how celestial navigation continues to be practiced regardless of electronic navigational aids such as the Global Positioning System (GPS). In addition, she studied navigation by the stars among ocean-going communities in Fiji, Tunisia, and the USA; organized the first African Cultural Astronomy conference in Ghana (2006); and began research on diversity issues among astrophysicists. This work led to her attaining academic positions in applied Anthropology (UA) and Gender studies (UCLA).

While at UCLA, Holbrook continued studying diversity issues among astrophysicists in collaboration with cultural anthropologist Sharon Traweek. She also began the AIP-AAS Oral History Project recording the lives of scientists and others connected to astronomy & astrophysics, and completed a study of the South African National Astrophysics and Space Sciences Programme (NASSP).

Holbrook has served as Vice President of the European Society for Astronomy in Culture (2008) and president of the Historical Astronomy Division of the American Astronomical Society, the Association of Women Faculty at the University of Arizona (2009) and the International Society of Archaeoastronomy & Astronomy in Culture (2018). In 2016-2017 they were an AAAS Science & Technology Policy Fellow at the National Science Foundation's Office of International Science and Engineering.

Holbrook has also written, produced, and starred in the films Black Suns: An Astrophysics Adventure (2017), SKA ≥ Karoo Radio Telescope (2016), and Hubble's Diverse Universe (2009). She is the co-creator of several educational YouTube series including Inside-A-Scientist's-Suitcase, Astronomy in Cape Town, and Science Tourist.

Holbrook advocates for women and ethnic minorities in Astronomy and Science.

She was elected a Legacy Fellow of the American Astronomical Society in 2020.

== Personal life ==
Holbrook married her former classmate and fellow astrophysicist Dr. Romeel Davé. They have two children.
