= Ashley Mulheron =

Scottish actress, tv presenter (b. 1983)

- Born: Ashley Gisele Mulheron; 8 February 1983 (age 43); Shotts, Scotland
- Education: Royal Central School of Speech and Drama
- Occupations: Actress; television presenter
- Years active: 2001–present
- Relatives: Tiffany Mulheron (sister)
- Website: ashleymulheron.net

Ashley Gisele Mulheron (born 8 February 1983) is a Scottish actress and television presenter. Mulheron trained as an actress on the one-year course at the Royal Central School of Speech and Drama in London. Mulheron was in the British comedy horror Lesbian Vampire Killers 2009, opposite James Corden and Mathew Horne. Mulheron also starred in The Bang Bang Club.

== Personal life ==
She is the sister of Tiffany Mulheron.

== Filmography ==
Film
Year	Title	Role	Notes
2009	Lesbian Vampire Killers	Trudi	
2010	The Bang Bang Club	Roxy	
2011	The Task	Shoe	

Television
Year	Title	Role	Notes
2001	Ukool	Presenter	
2005	California Dreaming	Herself	
2008	Primeval	Young Woman 2	Episode #2.3
2011	Kidnap and Ransom	Sharon Fenerty	Episodes: Episode #1.1; Episode #1.2
