= Evelyn D'Alroy =

English actress (1882–1915)

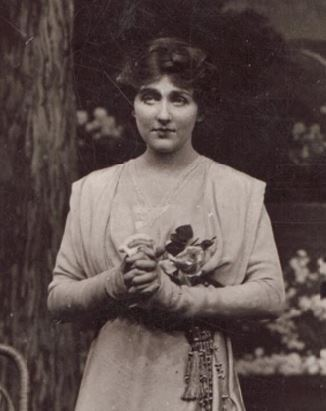

Evelyn D'Alroy (1882–1915; née Evelyn May Tegg, and on marriage Evelyn Watson), was an Edwardian English stage actress of considerable renown.

== Biography ==
Evelyn May Tegg was born in Stamford Hill and grew up there and in Tottenham with an older sister and younger brother. Her father William was a veterinary surgeon who died when she was 12, while her mother taught music.

She took to the stage in 1899, and made her London debut as the Duchesse de Longueville in a period piece, The Bond of Ninon by Clotilde Graves, at the Savoy Theatre in April 1906.

Her first considerable success was as Mrs. Cray in “The Builders” by Norah Keith at the Criterion on 10 November 1908. She then joined the Lewis Waller Players and regularly worked at London's Lyric Theatre.

In September 1909 she was taken on by Sir Herbert Beerbohm Tree at Her Majesty's Theatre. Her favourite role to play was reputedly Shakespeare's Ophelia. Portraits of Evelyn in various theatrical productions are held by the National Portrait Gallery.

In April 1915 while on tour she was taken ill suddenly in Sheffield with appendicitis. She was operated on at the hospital, and her appendix removed, and taken to a nursing home to recover, but died three days later of pneumonia with her husband—theatre critic Thomas Malcolm Watson—at her side.
