= Amy Fawsitt =

English actress

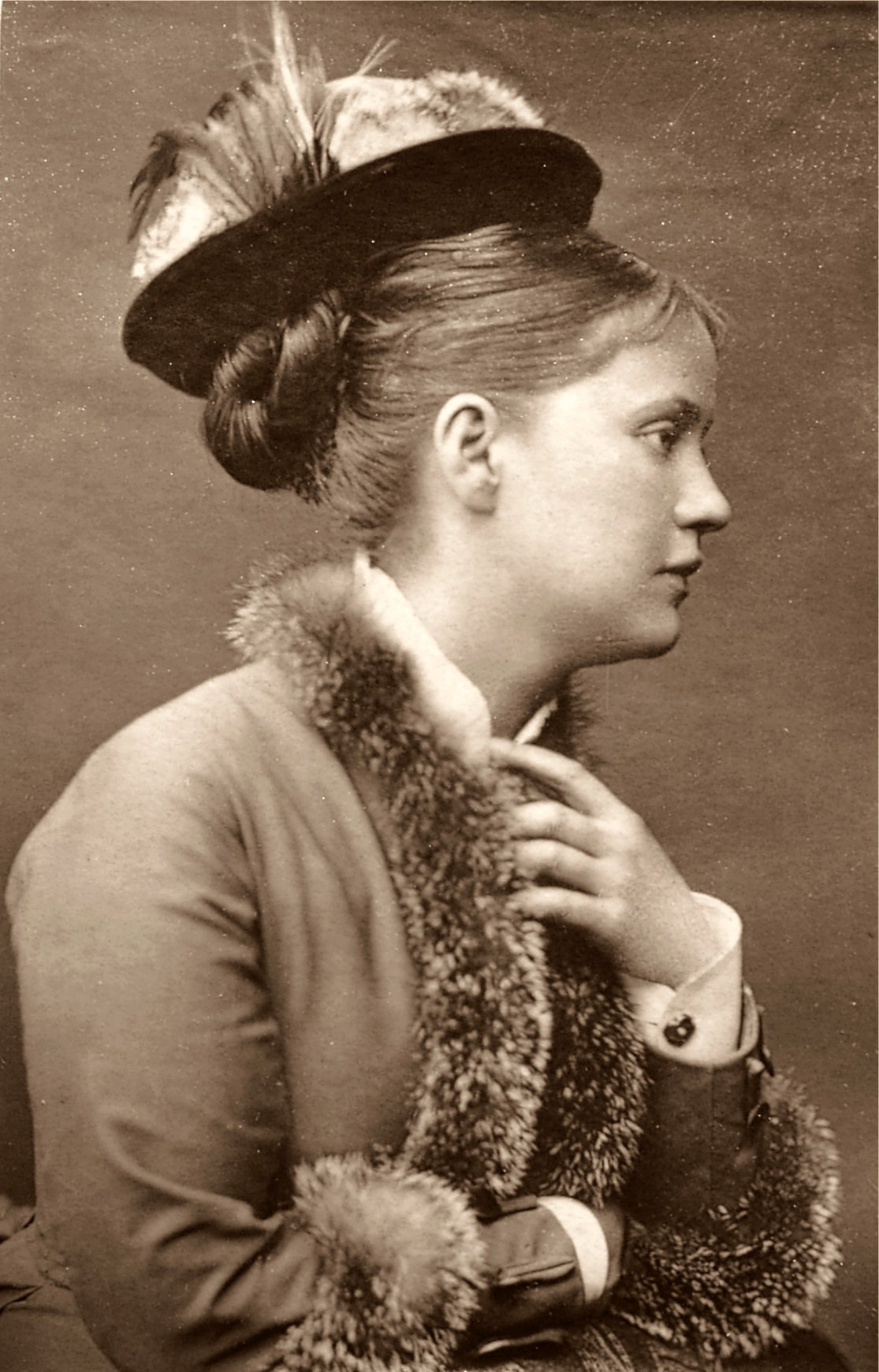
- Amy Fawsitt, circa 1870
- Born: 1836; London, England
- Died: 26 December 1876 (aged 39–40); New York City, US
- Other name: Mrs. Menzies
- Occupation: Actress

Amy Fawsitt (c. 1836 – 26 December 1876) also known as Mrs. Menzies, was an English actress.

In 1867, Miss Fawsitt made her first appearance on the London stage at the old Standard Theatre, Globe Theatre, Vaudeville Theatre. At this period she was looked upon as a promising rival of Marie Wilton.

Fawsitt died of tuberculosis on 26 December 1876, in New York. She had made her American debut in September 1876 in Life at the Fifth Avenue Theatre, and withdrew on 10 October.
