= Tiffany Mulheron =

Scottish actress (born 1984)

- Born: Tiffany Rose Mulheron; 18 December 1984 (age 41); Scotland
- Occupation: Actress
- Years active: 2002–2013
- Spouse: Jonathan Rose
- Children: 2
- Relatives: Ashley Mulheron (sister)

Tiffany Rose Mulheron (born 18 December 1984) is a Scottish former actress, best known for playing Natalie Osborne on Hollyoaks from July 2003 to November 2004.

== Personal life ==
Mulheron is married to businessman Jonathan Rose. She is the sister of fellow actress Ashley Mulheron.

== Filmography ==
Film
Year	Title	Role	Notes
2006	Just in Time	Lisa Remington	
2007	Namastey London	Susan	
2008	Daylight Robbery	Brunette	
2008	RocknRolla	Jackie	
2009	Lesbian Vampire Killers	Heidi	
2009	Dark Journey	Kelly	
2009	Vivaldi, the Red Priest	Anna Grimani	
2012	K-11	Tia Saxx	
2013	Liars All	Angie	

Television
Year	Title	Role	Notes
2003	Stacey Stone	Nat	Episode: "Kiss Chase"
2003–2004	Hollyoaks	Natalie Osborne	Series regular
2007–2008	Life Is Wild	Emily Banks	11 episodes
2009	Vivaldi		TV film
2010	Undercovers	Tessa	Episode: "Xerces – In tödlicher Mission"
2011	Pair of Kings	Princess Iris	Episode: "The King and Eyes"
