= Ann Catherine Holbrook =

- Born: Anne Catherine Jackson; 1780; Kingdom of Great Britain
- Died: January 1837 (aged 56–57); London, England, United Kingdom
- Occupations: Actress and writer

Ann Catherine Holbrook (born Ann Catherine Jackson; 1780 – January 1837) was a British actress and writer.

== Life ==
Ann Catherine Jackson was born in 1780. Her father was Thomas Jackson, a British comedian. By the time she was eighteen, she had lost both parents and she had played numerous leading roles, including that of Juliet. Her father died in 1798. That year, she signed a contract with a theater in Lewes. She married another actor with the surname Holbrook. He was a part of the same theater company. They traveled together, performing throughout England, including in Manchester with William Macready the elder. In 1809, she wrote "Memoirs of an Actress" having become disillusioned with the life of an actress. Holbrook documented her exploitation by managers and the poor monetary rewards. This book's publication was backed by nine "aristocrats". She wrote a number other books including Realities and Reflections: a Series of Original Tales in 1834. She died in London in January 1837.

== Selected works ==
- The Dramatist, or, Memoirs of the Stage, with the Life of the Authoress.
- Tales, Serious and Instructive, 1821,
- Constantine Castriot, an Historical Tale, 1829,
- Realities and Reflections: a Series of Original Tales in 1834.
