= Burning an Illusion =

1981 drama film by Menelik Shabazz

- Directed by: Menelik Shabazz
- Produced by: Vivien Pottersman
- Starring: Cassie McFarlane; Victor Romero Evans; Beverley Martin; Angela Wynter; Malcolm Fredericks; Corinne Skinner-Carter
- Cinematography: Roy Cornwall
- Edited by: Judy Seymour
- Music by: Seyoum Nefta
- Production company: BFI Production
- Release date: 1981
- Running time: 105 minutes
- Country: United Kingdom
- Language: English

Burning an Illusion is a 1981 British drama film written and directed by Menelik Shabazz, about a young British-born black woman's love life, mostly shot in London's Notting Hill and Ladbroke Grove communities. It was only the second British feature film to have been made by a black director, following Horace Ové's Pressure (1975), and is described by Stephen Bourne as "the first British film to give a black woman a voice of any kind." Imruh Bakari worked with Shabazz and co-founded Kuumba Productions with him.

== Plot ==
The film begins with scenes of a house party, with Pat on voice-over introducing herself, somewhat as if from a diary. She is 22 years old and not sure where she is going in life. Her voice-over narration is used at several other points in the film, but not often.

Her friend, Sonya, gives her and Del a lift home from the party. Sonya's boyfriend, Chamberlain, is in the front passenger seat and they are exuberantly chatty, while Del appears to whisper sweet nothings in Pat's ear in the back seat.

Del manages to obtain the phone number of Pat's parents, and happens to call it while she is there, despite her having had her own flat for three years. He invites her on a date, on which they go to a restaurant and drink wine after the meal, though they both agree they dislike the wine. They take a cab back to her flat. Del claims to be chivalrous because he opened the taxi door for her. They go up to the door of her flat, but Pat will not invite him in, saying: "It's late." Del protests that he has taken her to the "best black restaurant in town" and paid for everything, implying that he expects something in return, but ultimately he leaves slightly disappointed.

A while later, Del knocks on Pat's door. He is carrying a holdall. He has had a row with his father and either been kicked out of the family home or has left voluntarily (it is left unclear, perhaps for the viewer to decide which). He moves in with Pat.

One of Pat's friends is having issues with her boyfriend being dominating. Chatting on a park bench with a third friend, Pat says she should leave him. Meanwhile, at the pool club, Del's friends are saying that in a relationship the man should dominate. Pat asks Del when he's going to "settle down". Del points out that things are fine at the moment, though concedes "maybe in five or six months time".

At Del's work as a machinist there is a new foreman who appears to be racist, singling out Del for scrutiny. Del is often late for work and eventually loses his job. He thinks it is no big deal and that he will easily be able to find another job, but discovers that there are no machinist jobs available.

Pat continues to iron Del's shirts and cook his meals, shopping from her wages, while Del begins to take liberties, treating the place as his own, inviting friends round to gamble at cards and expecting Pat to wait on them. Eventually, she won't put up with it any more. She throws Del's friends out, during which some of them say that he needs to "control [his] woman". Then she tries to throw Del out, saying that the relationship is over. Del is initially unmoved, but then reacts angrily, claiming that it is his flat. Pat points out that it is hers. Then he slaps her quite violently. She grabs a knife from the kitchen drawer. He finally leaves. She does not break down in tears, but is visibly distressed.

Some time later, Del spots Pat in town. She tries to evade him, but he follows apace, and at a traffic island they are marooned. They agree to meet, whereupon Pat explains the problems with their relationship. Del orders wine, with a cheeky grin. When they wander and skip around the streets afterwards, it seems like they are new lovers.

They go to a gig with Sonya, Chamberlain, and other friends. Chamberlain becomes jealous when Sonya is talking to another man (a friend from school), and drags her outside. She says she can "talk to who[m] I like, when I like, and if you don't like it, you know what to do about it." He slaps her, and kicks her after she falls to the ground. The others gradually come outside, and try to restrain Chamberlain. Del tries to calm Chamberlain down. Chamberlain pulls a knife and says it's none of his business. The police arrive. Del resists manhandling from a plainclothes officer, pulls a knife, and slashes the officer's face.

He is sentenced to four years in prison.

Pat regularly visits Del in prison. Initially he is angry about the injustice. But then he gets into reading, and Pat sends him various books, which she has been reading herself, at least one of which is about black people's condition in society.

Del is not granted parole. The judge says the harsh sentence is needed to deter violent disorder.

Pat is shot in the leg in a drive-by shooting, and hospitalized. It's not clear why.

The film ends with Pat putting books in an incinerator, saying she could never believe her life and dreams could change so much.

== Main cast members ==
- Cassie McFarlane as Pat Williams
- Victor Romero Evans as Del Bennett
- Beverley Martin as Sonia
- Angela Wynter as Cynthia
- Malcolm Fredericks as Chamberlain
- Corinne Skinner-Carter as Pat's mother

== Background ==
Giving the history to the film's making, Shabazz wrote on his website (where Burning an Illusion is characterised as "a meeting ground for romantic love and politics"): "Being on the set of Horace Ove's movie Pressure fuelled my inspiration to make Burning an Illusion. I hadn't known Horace prior but my then business partner David Kinoshi was playing one of the characters in the film and invited me along. Seeing a black director at the helm made me see that creating that kind of film was possible. ... The title Burning an Illusion, as with many of my films, comes from a reggae song. In this case, Culture had a lyric 'Burning an illusion inna Babylon' which became the inspiration for the title."

Burning an Illusion, according to Ade Solanke on the British Film Institute's Screenonline website, avoids "the tradition of placing white males at the centre of a story". It is also rare example of prioritising the personal drama of black woman over the socio-economic and political conflicts, as "it's about black people who aren't radical". Solanke writes: "Like all drama, the film is about characters facing conflicts. ... [F]or most of the story it dramatises personal conflicts, not socio-economic or political ones."

== Release ==
=== Critical reception ===
Reviewing the film in The Black Scholar, Roland S. Jefferson wrote: "What an eye opening surprise! Menelik Shabazz has given us our first glimpse of contemporary black life in London and it is long overdue." In Sight & Sound, Nick Roddick concluded: "It reflects an experience, burns an illusion and portrays a consciousness. That, in the context of its production and its potential distribution, is more than enough."

Almost 40 years after release, Burning an Illusion was reviewed in mainstream media. In 2020, David Robinson wrote in The Times that the film "dramatizes issues, attitudes and hazards of life in London's black communities." In 2021, Derek Malcolm for The Guardian described it as "lively, accurate and thought-provoking, burning illusions without substituting too many of its own. A highly promising debut." However, in 2020, Nigel Andrews at The Financial Times considered it "a movie that begins with a buoyant free-fall individualism [that] ends up like a speak-your-fate agitprop manifesto."

=== Awards ===
The film won the Grand Prix at the Amiens International Film Festival in France, and Cassie McFarlane won the Evening Standard Award for "Most Promising New Actress".

Burning an Illusion was honoured with a Screen Nation Classic Film Award in October 2011.

== See also ==
- Pressure
