= The Orchid House =

The Orchid House is the title of:

- The Orchid House (novel), written by Phyllis Shand Allfrey in 1953;
- The Orchid House (TV serial), a television programme based on it, directed by Horace Ové and broadcast on Britain's Channel 4 in 1991
