= Madge Sinclair =

Jamaican actress (1938–1995)

Madge Sinclair CD
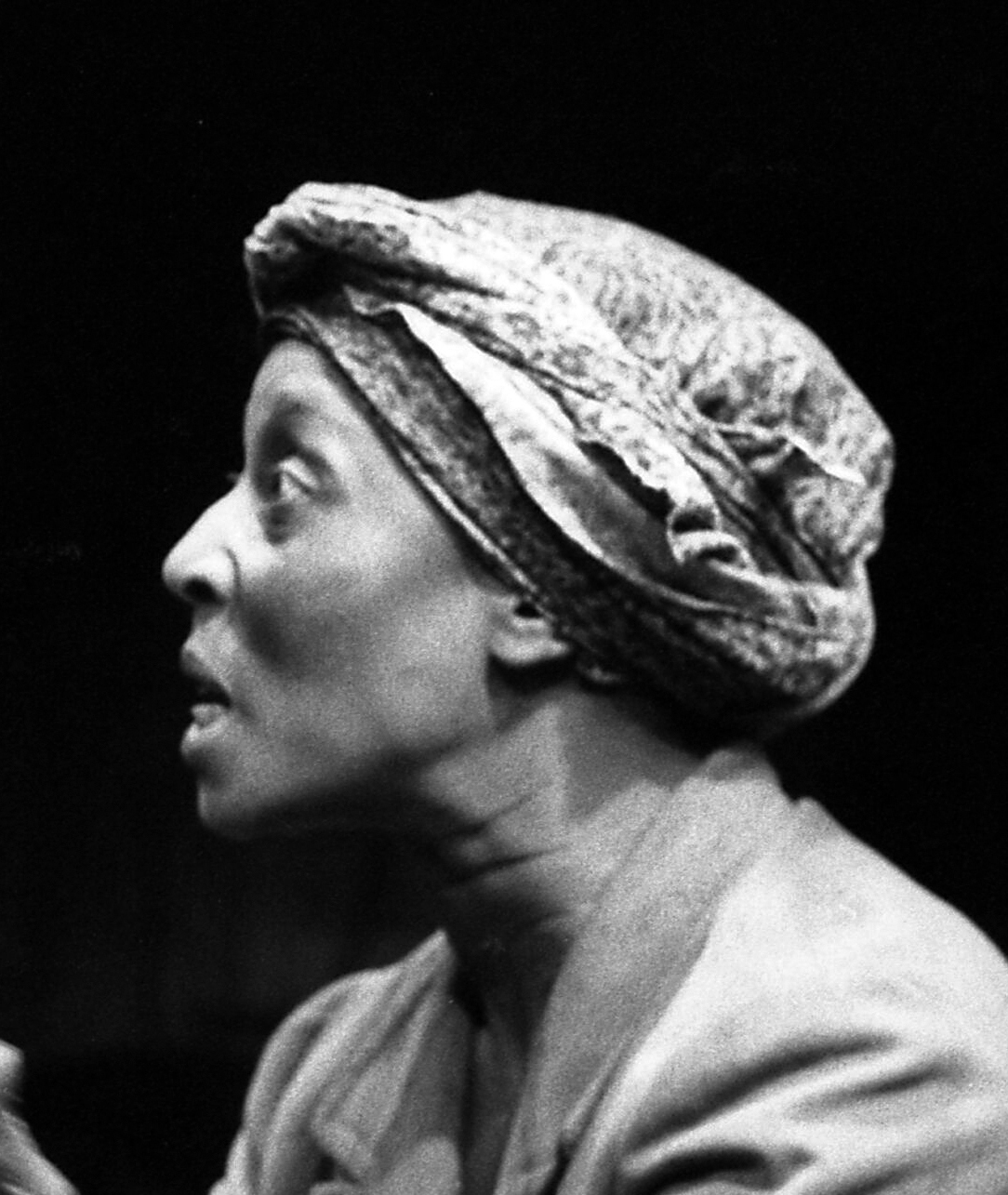
- Sinclair on stage in 1986
- Born: Madge Dorita Walters; April 28, 1938; Kingston, Colony of Jamaica
- Died: December 20, 1995 (aged 57); Los Angeles, California, U.S.
- Occupation: Actress
- Years active: 1972–1995
- Known for: Leona Hamilton – Cornbread, Earl and Me; Belle Reynolds – Roots; Queen Aoleon – Coming to America; Voice of Sarabi – The Lion King; Widow Woman – Convoy; Ernestine Shoop - Trapper John, M.D.
- Spouses: Royston Sinclair (m. 1956; div. 1969) Dean Compton (m. 1982)
- Children: 2

Madge Dorita Sinclair CD (née Walters; April 28, 1938 – December 20, 1995) was a Jamaican actress best known for her roles in Cornbread, Earl and Me (1975), Convoy (1978), Coming to America (1988), Trapper John, M.D. (1980–1986), and the ABC TV miniseries Roots (1977). Sinclair also voiced the character of Sarabi, Mufasa's mate and Simba's mother, in the Disney animated feature film The Lion King (1994). A five-time Emmy Award nominee, Sinclair won the Primetime Emmy Award for Outstanding Supporting Actress in a Drama Series for her role as "Empress" Josephine in Gabriel's Fire in 1991.

== Early life and education ==
Born in Kingston, Jamaica, to Jamaican parents Herbert and Jemima Walters, Sinclair studied at Shortwood College for Women. After completing her studies, she worked as a teacher in Jamaica until 1966, when she left for New York to pursue her career in acting. Sinclair began acting with Joseph Papp's Public Theatre. In 1971 she portrayed Clytemnestra in the New York Shakespearean Festival production of The Wedding of Iphigenia.

== Career ==
Sinclair made her film debut as Mrs. Scott in Conrack (1974) opposite Jon Voight; a role which earned her a nomination for the NAACP Image Award for Outstanding Actress in a Motion Picture. Her next major critical success was as Bell Reynolds in the 1977 ABC mini-series Roots for which she received her first nomination for a Primetime Emmy Award.

Following Roots, she starred in the 1978 film Convoy as the Widow Woman, and she played Leona Hamilton in Cornbread, Earl and Me. Also in 1978, she co-starred in the short-lived sitcom Grandpa Goes to Washington. Sinclair went on to a stint in the 1980s as nurse Ernestine Shoop on the series Trapper John, M.D. opposite Pernell Roberts. She received three Emmy nominations for her work on the show, and critic Donald Bogle praised her for "maintaining her composure and assurance no matter what the script imposed on her". In 1988, Sinclair played Queen Aoleon alongside James Earl Jones's King Jaffe Joffer in the Eddie Murphy comedy Coming to America, which reunited her on screen with her Roots husband and co-star John Amos. Later, both Sinclair and Jones would reunite as the queen and king for the roles of Sarabi and Mufasa, Simba’s parents, in the Disney animated film The Lion King (1994). The film became one of the best-selling titles ever on home video. It would also be her last film role. The two also collaborated on the series Gabriel's Fire, which earned Sinclair an Emmy in 1991 for Best Supporting Actress in a Dramatic Series, famously beating out the expected winner, L.A. Law's Diana Muldaur.

Sinclair played the role of Lally in the 1991 Channel 4 television miniseries The Orchid House (based on Phyllis Shand Allfrey's novel of the same name), directed by Horace Ové, and also received critical praise for her supporting role in the 1992 television movie Jonathan: The Boy Nobody Wanted with JoBeth Williams. In 1993, Sinclair came to London to appear on stage at the Cochrane Theatre in The Lion, by Michael Abbensetts and directed by Horace Ové, for the Talawa Theatre Company. From 1994 to 1995, she played a supporting role in the short-lived ABC-TV sitcom Me and the Boys, which starred Steve Harvey. Sinclair, in her role as the captain of the USS Saratoga in Star Trek IV: The Voyage Home, is commonly cited as the first female Starfleet starship captain to appear in Star Trek. Years later, Sinclair played Geordi La Forge's mother, captain of the USS Hera, in Star Trek: The Next Generation's "Interface". Her final acting role was in an episode of the sitcom Dream On, which first aired one month before her death.

== Personal life ==
Sinclair was married to Royston Sinclair, a Jamaican police officer, from 1956 until 1969 and had two sons with him. In 1982, Sinclair married actor Dean Compton, to whom she was still married at the time of her death.

== Death ==
Sinclair died on December 20, 1995, aged 57, following a 13-year battle with leukemia. Her remains were cremated and her ashes were scattered in her hometown in Jamaica. She was posthumously awarded the Order of Distinction, rank of Commander, for service in the performing arts by Prime Minister of Jamaica, P. J. Patterson in October 2000.

== Filmography ==
=== Film ===
Year	Title	Role	Notes
1972	The Witches of Salem: The Horror and the Hope	Tituba	Short
1974	I Love You... Good-bye	Salesgirl	
1974	Conrack	Mrs. Scott	Nominated—NAACP Image Award for Outstanding Actress in a Motion Picture
1975	Cornbread, Earl and Me	Leona Hamilton	
1976	I Will, I Will... for Now	Dr. Williams	
1976	Leadbelly	Miss Eula	
1978	Convoy	Widow Woman	
1978	Uncle Joe Shannon	Margaret	
1986	Star Trek IV: The Voyage Home	Saratoga Captain	Uncredited
1988	Coming to America	Queen Aoleon	
1990	The End of Innocence	Nurse Bowlin	
1994	The Lion King	Sarabi	Voice; final film role

=== Television films ===
Year	Title	Role	Notes
1975	Guess Who's Coming to Dinner	Sarah Prentiss	
1978	One in a Million: The Ron LeFlore Story	Georgia LeFlore	
1980	Guyana Tragedy: The Story of Jim Jones	Mrs. Jefferson	
1980	High Ice	Dr. Pittman	
1987	Look Away	Elizabeth Keckley	
1992	Jonathan: The Boy Nobody Wanted	Faye Lincoln	

=== Television series ===
Year	Title	Role	Notes
1972	Sesame Street	Dr. Marzullo	Episode 0343: Measles vaccination
1972	Madigan	Boots	Episode: "The Midtown Beat"
1974	Medical Center	Arbiter	Episode: "Tainted Lady"
1974	The Waltons	Minnie Doze	Episode: "The Visitor"
1975	Joe Forrester	Sheila Gates	Episode: "Stake Out"
1975	Doctors' Hospital	n/a	Episode: "Come at Last to Love"
1976	Executive Suite	Judge Gillespie	Episode: "Who Shall Hall Bring Mercy"
1977	Roots	Bell Reynolds	3 episodes Nominated—Primetime Emmy Award for Outstanding Lead Actress in a Limited Series or Movie
1977	Serpico	Michelle	Episode: "One Long Tomorrow"
1978	ABC Afterschool Specials	Mrs. Bradsbury	Episode: "The Rag Tag Champs"
1979	The White Shadow	Louelia Judd	Episode: "Sudden Death"
1980–1986	Trapper John, M.D.	Ernestine Shoop	129 episodes Nominated—Primetime Emmy Award for Outstanding Supporting Actress in a Drama Series (1983–85)
1984	ABC Afterschool Specials	Miss Thomas	Episode: "Backwards: The Riddle of Dyslexia"
1987	Mathnet	Amelia Airliver	Episode: "Problem of the Trojan Hamburger"
1987	Ohara	Gussie Lemmons	11 episodes
1987	Starman	Lorraine Michaels	Episode: "The Test"
1989	Gideon Oliver	Angela Holmes	Episode: "By the Waters of Babylon"
1989	Roseanne	Muriel Johnston	Episode: "Guilt by Disassociation"
1989	Midnight Caller	Ida May	Episode: "Take Back the Streets"
1990–1991	Gabriel's Fire	Empress Josephine	22 episodes Primetime Emmy Award for Outstanding Supporting Actress in a Drama Series; Nominated—Viewers for Quality Television Award for Best Supporting Actress in a Quality Drama Series
1991–1992	Pros and Cons	Josephine Austin	12 episodes
1991	The Orchid House	Lally	4 episodes
1992	L.A. Law	Jessica Rollins	Episode: "Diet, Diet My Darling"
1992	Tales from the Crypt	Lucille	Episode: "Curiosity Killed"
1993	Alex Haley's Queen	Dora	Episode 3
1993	Star Trek: The Next Generation	Captain Silva La Forge	Episode: "Interface"
1994–1995	Me and the Boys	Mary Tower	19 episodes
1995	Dream On	Mrs. Charles	Episode: "Little Orphan Eddie"
