= Allfrey =

Allfrey is a surname. Notable people with the surname include:

- Charles Walter Allfrey (1895–1964), British Army general in World War II
- Ellah Wakatama Allfrey (born 1966), Zimbabwean literary editor and publisher
- Phyllis Shand Allfrey (1908–1986), Dominican author and politician
