= Invisible Man and the Masque of Blackness =

Art installation by Zak Ové

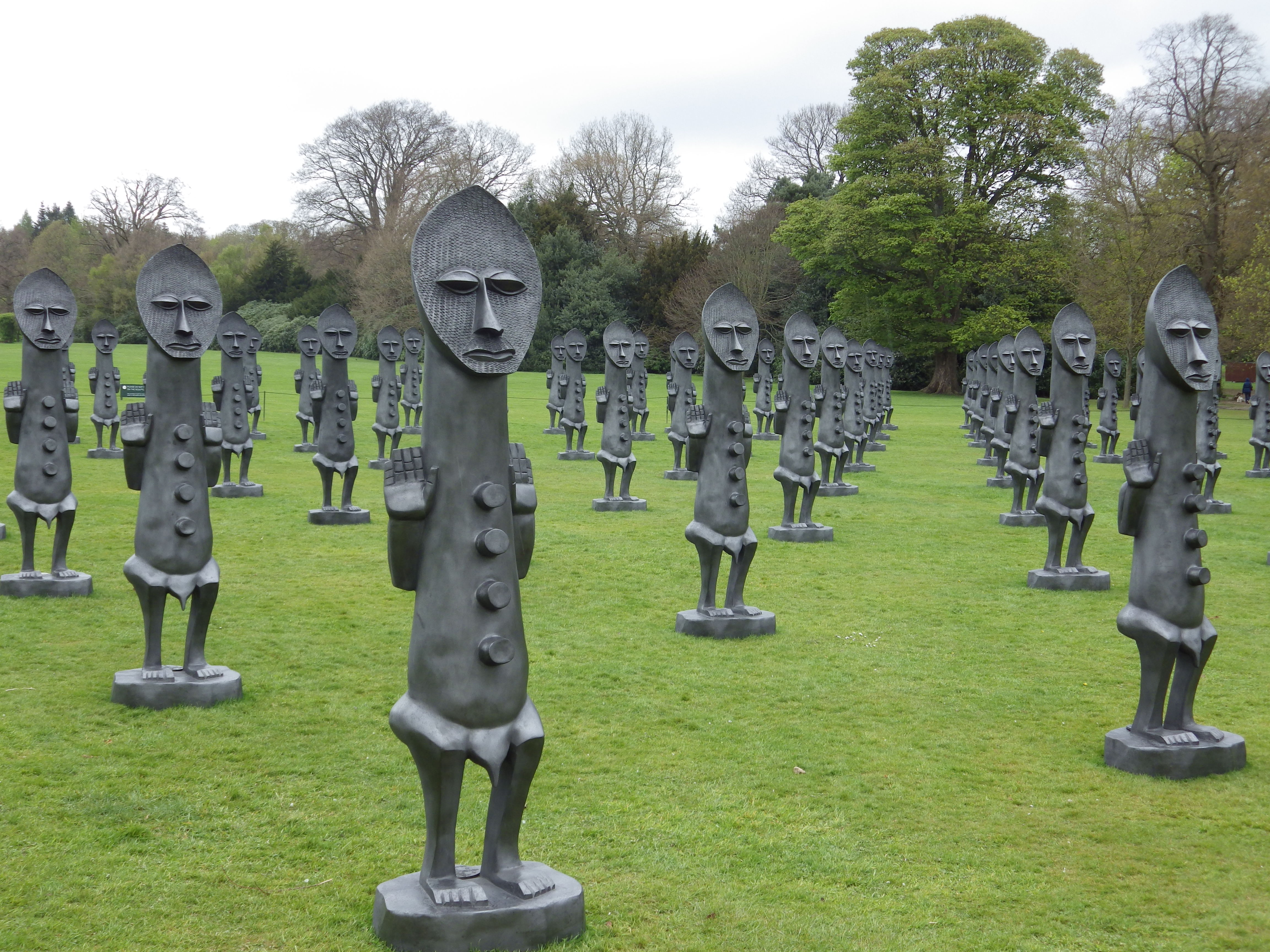
- 80 sculptures by British-Trinidadian artist Zak Ové. Black and Blue: The Invisible Man and the Masque of Blackness, a mass of identical two-metre-tall figures
- Artist: Zak Ové
- Completion date: 6 October 2016
- Medium: graphite
- Location: London (2016), Yorkshire (2017), San Francisco (2018), East Winterslow (2019), Los Angeles (2019)

Invisible Man and the Masque of Blackness (sometimes titled Black and Blue: The Invisible Men and the Masque of Blackness) was an art installation by Zak Ové that has been installed in several major cities. It features 40 (or sometimes 80) identical statues, each weighing approximately 300 lbs.

Ové first installed the work in the courtyard of Somerset House in London, as part of the 2016 edition of the contemporary African art fair 1:54. He intended it as "a rebuke" to Ben Jonson's plays The Masque of Blackness and The Masque of Beauty, performed at Somerset House in 1605 and 1608, starring the queen consort Anne of Denmark and other performers in blackface. Ové was inspired by a meter-tall wooden sculpture his father, Horace Ové, obtained in Kenya in the early 1970s, and attempted to create "a work that spoke about Africa's diaspora, what it is to be an African born away from the continent" by replicating and enlarging the figure into a group of massive graphite sculptures, "almost as a tribe out of context."

The work was then installed elsewhere in England, at Yorkshire Sculpture Park from April 2017 - June 2018, doubling the number of figures to eighty. In July 2018, it traveled abroad to stand outside San Francisco City Hall in Civic Center, San Francisco, in the U.S. state of California, remaining until November 2018. A 40-figure version was installed at the New Art Centre in East Winterslow, Wiltshire, England in June 2019. From July – November 2019, it was installed in the B. Gerald Cantor Sculpture Garden of the Los Angeles County Museum of Art in Los Angeles, interspersed with several bronzes by the 19th-century French sculptor Auguste Rodin.
