= Doreen Ingleton =

Doreen Ingleton (born 11 January 1956) is a Jamaican English actress, known for Everybody Loves Sunshine, The Incredible Adventures of Professor Branestawm and Filth: The Mary Whitehouse Story.

== Credits ==
=== Television ===
Year	Title	Role	Notes
1975	Within These Walls	Joyce	
1988	Rumpole of the Bailey	Ruby Churchill	
1987	The Bill	Canteen lady	
1989	EastEnders	Ward Nurse	
1990	The Bill	Pearl	
1992	Inspector Morse	Annie Lever	
1996	EastEnders	Senior Nurse	
1999	Grange Hill	Mrs. Braithwaite	2 episodes
1999	Family Affairs	Dusty McHugh	2 episodes
2003	The Afternoon Play	Mother of the Bride	
2003	Doctors	Debbie	
2006	Doctors	Wilma Crossley	
2006	Green Wing	Nurse	
2011	Law and Order: UK	Receptionist	

=== Film ===
Year	Title	Role
1999	Everybody Loves Sunshine	Ray's Mum
2008	Filth: The Mary Whitehouse Story	Anne
2014	The Incredible Adventures of Professor Branestawm	Miss Silt

=== Theatre ===
Year	Title	Role	Playwright	Venue	Notes
1988	Cat on a Hot Tin Roof	Sookey	Tennessee Williams	Lyttleton Theatre, National Theatre	
1988	The Changeling	Servant/Mad Person	Thomas Middleton and William Rowley	Lyttleton Theatre, National Theatre	
1994–1995	Leave Taking	Mai	Winsome Pinnock	National Theatre touring production	
