= Indra Ové =

British actress

- Born: 14 October 1967 (age 58); London, England
- Education: Royal Central School of Speech and Drama
- Occupation: Actress
- Years active: 1980–present
- Spouse: Oliver Loncraine
- Father: Horace Ové

Indra Ové (born 14 October 1967) is a British film, television and stage actress.

== Career ==
Ové was born in Westminster, London. She trained at the Central School of Speech and Drama. She appeared in the 1994 film Interview with the Vampire portraying a New Orleans prostitute who interacts with Tom Cruise's Lestat. She had a small role in The Fifth Element (1997) as a VIP stewardess with whom Chris Tucker's character flirts, was in Othello (playing Bianca to Laurence Fishburne's lead) and had a small role (as Ella Fontaine) in Resident Evil. Her television roles include the British children's series The Latchkey Children and The New Worst Witch, the British–German sci-fi co-production Space Island One and the British medical drama television series Holby City. She also appeared in a 1992 episode of Desmond's, playing Samantha. Ové appeared in a 1994 episode of Soldier Soldier, playing Melanie Burrows and also in a 1999 two-part Bugs story as Zephyr. In 2019, Ové appeared as a First Order officer in Star Wars: The Rise of Skywalker.

She is the sister of artist/director Zak Ové and the daughter of pioneer Trinidad-born filmmaker Horace Ové.

== Filmography ==
=== Film ===
Year	Title	Role	Notes
1994	Interview with the Vampire	New Orleans whore	
1995	Othello	Bianca	
1997	The Fifth Element	VIP stewardess	
1999	Wavelengths	Mona	Short
2000	The Dreamer	Female clone	Short
2001	Fallen Dreams	Karen	
2002	Resident Evil	Ms. Black	
2002	Club Le Monde	Elaine	
2003	It's All About Love	Production Assistant	
2006	Blinding Lights	Clare	Short
2009	My One and Only	Diner waitress	
2011	Il maestro	Judge	Short
2012	Wonder	Lucy	Short
2013	Mr. Invisible	News reporter	Short
2014	I Trust You	Chantelle's mother	Short
2014	Dubois	Linda	Short
2014	Jurassic	Lisa	Short
2017	Finding Your Feet	Corrinna	
2018	Second Spring	Trish	
2019	Pagans	Sasha's mom	Short
2019	Star Wars: The Rise of Skywalker	First Order officer	
2020	Richard II	Mowbray	
2020	Exposed	Mrs. James	Short
2021	Resurrection	Sapphira	
2021	Imagine	Presenter	Short
2022	Imagine X	Presenter	Short
2022	Anything you Can Do	Heather	Short
2024	How to Succeed in Biscuits Without Really Trying	Emma	Short
2025	The Bends	Zoe	Short

=== Television ===
Year	Title	Role	Notes
1980	The Latchkey Children	Etty	6 episodes
1991	The Orchid House	Cornelie	TV mini-series (2 episodes)
1992	Desmond's	Samantha Martin	1 episode: "Two Red Eye"
1994	The Chief	Stephanie Rink	1 episode
1994	Chandler & Co	Misty	4 episodes
1994	Soldier Soldier	Melanie Burrows	Episode: "Baby Love"
1995	She's Out	Angela Dunn	TV mini-series (6 episodes)
1996	Casualty	Pam	Episode: "Subject to Contract"
1997	More Is Less	Quant	TV short
1998	Space Island One	Paula Hernandez	Main role (26 episodes)
1999	The Cyberstalking	Devon	TV film
1999	Bugs	Zephyr	2 episodes
1999	Cleopatra	Charmian	TV mini-series
2000	Attachments	Tyler Clarkson	1 episode
2003–2015	Holby City	Karen Gilham / Frankie Weston / Ava Philbin	10 episodes
2003–2016	Doctors	Gina James / Lowra Golzaro / Diane Turpin / Roxy Ripley / Mary Hickson	4 episodes
2005	The New Worst Witch	Miss Nightingale	5 episodes
2006	The Best Man	Natalie	TV film
2008	Midsomer Murders	Charlotte Knight	Episode: "Left for Dead"
2009	Hellhounds	The Seer	TV film
2011	Casualty	Frankie Claibourne	Episode: "Wild Horses"
2014	Topsy and Tim	Rosie	Episode: "Wrapping Paper"
2014	Glue	Jude	Episode: "James/Cal"
2015	The Dumping Ground	Sylvie	Episode: "Fake It to Make It"
2015	A.D. The Bible Continues	Sapphira	Episode: "The Wrath"
2018	Requiem	TV host	Episode: "Bessie"
2018	Marcella	Kyra	1 episode
2018	Unforgotten	Maria Carr	6 episodes
2018	Dark Heart	Kerry Davies	1 episode
2019	Good Omens	Maude	Episode: "Saturday Morning Funtime"
2019	Death in Paradise	Louise Palmer	Episode: "Beyond the Shining Sea, Part 1"
2021–2023	Sex Education	Anna	8 episodes
2022	Deadline	Barbara	4 episodes
2024	The Acolyte	Master Holden	1 episode
2024	Peaked	Diane	2024
2024	Doctor Who: The Fourth Doctor Adventures	Voice Roles	Podcast Series
