= Menelik Shabazz =

British film director (1954–2021)

- Born: 30 May 1954; St John, Colony of Barbados
- Died: 28 June 2021 (aged 67); Harare, Zimbabwe
- Occupations: Film director, producer, educator, writer
- Notable work: Burning an Illusion (1981)
- Website: menelikshabazz.co.uk

Menelik Shabazz (30 May 1954 – 28 June 2021) was a Barbados-born British film director, producer, educator, and writer, acknowledged as a pioneer in the development of independent Black British cinema, having been at the forefront of contemporary British filmmaking for more than 30 years. Shabazz is best known for the 1981 film Burning an Illusion, his first feature.

He was also co-founder in the 1980s of Kuumba film production company and Ceddo Film and Video Workshop, as well as being "founding father of the BFM media project" as the publisher of Black Filmmaker Magazine (BFM) and creator of BFM International Film Festival.

== Early years ==
Shabazz was born in St John, Barbados, in 1954. His family immigrated to the United Kingdom when he was five years old. He had watched mobile cinema in his village as a child, and at the age of 18 began to think about making films after being introduced to Sony's first portable video technology while studying at North London College. He enrolled at the London International Film School in 1974, and though unable to attend for long, because he did not receive a "discretionary grant" from his local borough council, "he was able to grasp important knowledge, confidence and inspiration to move forward as a filmmaker."

== Films ==
=== Step Forward Youth and Breaking Point ===
In 1976 Shabazz directed Step Forward Youth, a 30-minute documentary about London-born black youths, after which he worked in commercial television, directing Breaking Point (for ATV, 1978), which was shown on prime-time TV and contributed to the repeal of the Sus law that was being used to criminalize Black youth.

=== Burning an Illusion ===
Shabazz's first feature-length film was Burning an Illusion, which he wrote and directed with financial support from the British Film Institute (BFI). It was released to acclaim in 1981 and was called "one of the most important feature films ever made in Britain". About a young woman's love life, and mostly shot in London's Notting Hill and Ladbroke Grove communities, it was "the first British film to give a black woman a voice of any kind". It was only the second British feature to have been made by a black director, following Horace Ové's 1975 Pressure. Burning an Illusion won the Grand Prix at the Amiens International Film Festival in France, and its star Cassie McFarlane won the Evening Standard Award for "Most Promising New Actress".

=== Blood Ah Go Run ===
Blood Ah Go Run, made in 1981, documents the response of the Black community to the New Cross fire, including the "Black People's Day of Action"—in the words of Assata Shakur, "Superbly captured by the filmmaker Menelik Shabazz, collectively as we marched past Fleet Street, the city of London was brought to a standstill"—and the subsequent uprising in Brixton.

=== Kuumba and Ceddo productions ===
In 1982, Shabazz co-founded Kuumba Productions with Imruh Bakari and Henry Martin to provide an outlet for independent film projects, and produced for Channel 4 the drama Big George is Dead (1983), directed by Henry Martin, and the documentary I am Not Two Islands.

In 1984, with founding members including Bakari, Lazell Daley and Milton Bryan, Shabazz also formed Ceddo Film and Video Workshop, a franchised collective that produced films for Channel 4, through which he wrote and directed the docu-drama Time and Judgement, telling the history of the struggles of the Black community across the world by using newsreel footage. Ceddo produced a number of documentaries, including Street Warriors (1985), The People's Account (1987) and Omega Rising – Women of Rastafari. His vision for Ceddo was "to empower black film production, training and film screenings". Funded by Channel 4 and the British Film Institute, Ceddo carried out groundbreaking film production and community training initiatives, and hosted a number of screenings with filmmakers, such as Spike Lee (School Daze).

=== Catch a Fire (1996) ===
In 1996, as part of the six-part BBC Education series Hidden Empire, he made the drama documentary Catch A Fire about the life of Paul Bogle and the 1865 Morant Bay Rebellion. It includes an interview Shabazz made with Bogle's great-grandson Philip Bogle (who died the following year), whom Shabazz met while visiting Jamaica with historian Cecil Gutzmore.

=== The Story of Lover's Rock (2011) ===
In 2011 Shabazz's film in the "romantic reggae" genre, entitled The Story Of Lover's Rock (which was inspired by an announcement of the Lovers Rock Gala Awards organised by Castro Brown), was one of the highest grossing documentaries in UK cinemas. He described it as a "fusion documentary": "It looks at lover's rock through interviews, comedy, live performance, dance and archive footage. It tells the story of its south London origins to success in Japan and becoming a global brand. In between, we look at the underground scene around the music – its intimate dance, the soundsystems, the social backdrop in the volatile era of the 70s and 80s – as well as the lack of mainstream success in the UK."

=== Looking for Love (2015) ===
His film Looking for Love (largely self-funded), an insightful look into the lives and loves of singletons in the digital era, made its debut at the BFI in May 2015 to a sold-out audience, and in August went on to national release in key UK cinemas, including: Vue Cinemas in Shepherds Bush, Birmingham and Westfield Stratford; Tricycle Theatre, Kilburn; Hackney Picturehouse; Ritzy Cinema; Dalston Rio (with a Director Q&A on 22 August); Streatham Odeon, and Midlands Arts Centre.

It was generally well received, with The Guardian reviewer finding it "engaging and sympathetic", and others calling it "humorous, yet educational", and commenting that its approach to gender relationships in the black community "opens a long overdue debate". The British Black list found it "both edifying and important", going on to say: "Unsurprisingly, Looking For Love does not have all the answers but cleverly points the fingers back in the right direction", while the film critic of The Observer stated: "Interviews, poetry, dance and music combine in Menelik Shabazz's frank, funny and accessible account of heterosexual modern love. Focusing on the first-hand experiences of the black British community – from young singletons out and about at carnival to a couple who have been married for 50 years – this shoestring-budget doc lends a non-judgmental ear to opinions that range from the eye-opening to the jaw-dropping. A tighter edit may have reined in some of the woollier psychobabble, but the desire to place abusive relationships within a wider historical context (slavery, emasculation etc) pays dividends. Comedians lend mouthy pizzazz but it's the ordinary tales that tell the greatest truths."

== Educational work ==
Shabazz lectured and conducted workshops internationally, including in the Caribbean and throughout the UK and US at such venues and educational institutions as the National Film and Television School, University of Southampton, University of Leeds, University of North East London, University of Westminster, London International Film School, British Film Institute, New York University and Howard University. Some of his work (including The Story of Lover's Rock, Step Forward Youth, Breaking Point, Blood Ah Go Run, Catch a Fire, Time and Judgement, Burning an Illusion and Looking for Love) are available on DVD.

== Black Filmmaker Magazine and bfm International Film Festival ==
In 1998, Shabazz founded Black Filmmaker Magazine (bfm), the first black film publication aimed at the global black filmmaking industry, and over the next decade the publication was distributed in Europe and the US. In 1999 he started the bfm International Film Festival as a platform for screening black world cinema and to inspire British talent, which became the biggest of its kind in Europe. He said: "BFM was the outcome of my frustrations in the film industry. I wanted to channel that anger into something positive which initially started as a magazine (Black Filmmaker) and the intention to pass on information to the next generation about the film industry. One thing that was happening at the time was a lack of young people entering into the industry on a consistent level. The magazine was an interface between industry and filmmakers and out of the initiative developed the Black Filmmaker International Film Festival." In June 2019, Black Filmmaker Magazine was re-launched online in collaboration with his longtime friend and business partner, filmmaker and photographer Floyd Webb.

== Personal life ==
Shabazz died on 28 June 2021 in Zimbabwe. He was 67, and suffered from complications of diabetes prior to his death. According to his obituary in The Guardian, in April 2021 he had begun shooting a new feature film called The Spirits Return, which was a project "hatched during lockdown in Zimbabwe ... an ancestral love story about Nubia, a British woman who visits Zimbabwe searching for her cultural and ancestral roots."

== Selected filmography ==
- 1977: Step Forward Youth—30-minute documentary (director)
- 1978: Breaking Point – The Sus Law Controversy—38 minutes (ATV)
- 1981: Burning an Illusion—feature, 107 minutes (writer and director)
- 1981: Blood Ah Go Run—20-minute newsreel (co-director with Imruh Caesar)
- 1988: Time and Judgement—sci-documentary (director; Channel 4)
- 1996: Catch a Fire—30-minute docu-drama (part of Hidden Empire series, BBC 2)
- 2011: The Story of Lover's Rock—romantic reggae (director)
- 2015: Looking for Love—documentary, 115 minutes (director/producer)
- 2018: HEAT—pilot TV drama
- 2019: Pharaohs Unveiled—feature documentary (director, writer; SunRa Pictures)

== Awards and acknowledgement ==
- 1982: Grand Prix at the Amiens International Film Festival, for Burning an Illusion
- 1996: Prize Pieces Award from National Black Programming Consortium, US, for Catch a Fire
- 2011: The Story of Lover's Rock is "one of the highest grossing documentaries in UK cinemas" of the year.
- 2012: Jury award for Best Documentary at the Trinidad International Film Festival, for The Story of Lover's Rock
