= Allister Bain =

Grenadian-born British actor, playwright and screenwriter (1932–2026)

- Born: Allister Victor Bain; 13 January 1932; St Andrew's, Grenada, British Windward Islands
- Died: 24 September 2026 (aged 94); Islington, London, England
- Occupations: Actor, playwright, screenwriter, dancer
- Years active: c. 1957–2009

Allister Victor Bain (13 January 1932 – 24 September 2026) was a Grenadian-born British actor, playwright, screenwriter and dancer, who moved to the United Kingdom in 1958. A veteran of British performing arts, his television appearances included roles in Us Girls, Vanity Fair, Bugs, Doctor Who and Waking the Dead. On the stage, Bain appeared in plays by Derek Walcott, Earl Lovelace, Michael Abbensetts, Noël Coward, and William Shakespeare, among many others.

== Life and career ==
Allister Victor Bain was born on 13 January 1932 in St Andrew's in the island country of Grenada, in the Caribbean. His parents were Thorance and Beatrice Bain. In 1958, Bain moved to England, having taught Dorothy Dandridge to limbo for the film Island in the Sun (1957).

Sometime before the start of his career, Bain was in charge of his own dance troupe, the Bee Wee Ballet of Grenada, whose performances were some of the first that contributed to the birth of what became the Notting Hill Carnival.

From the 1970s, Bain appeared on stage in many notable productions. In 1978, he was in the original cast of Michael McMillan's play The School Leaver, which was produced at the Royal Court Theatre's Young Writers' Festival. In the 1990 production of Winsome Pinnock's play Leave Taking at the Lyric Theatre, Hammersmith, Bain played the role of Broderick.

Bain wrote a number of plays during his career. His first play, 2001 People, was written in 2001. His play Effie May debuted at Oval House Theatre in 2005, when he was 73 years old. Catalysta was staged in 2008 (also at Oval House, with a cast that included Angela Wynter and Carmen Munroe), and Pardon My Simplicity in January 2012 (Rosemary Branch Theatre). He was also the author of One Slice of History (Good Vibes Records & Music Ltd, December 2012).

His memoir, The French Cashew Tree, was launched at New Beacon Books, at an evening event hosted by broadcaster Alex Pascall in November 2017.

Bain died in London on 24 September 2026, aged 94. He was cremated in Islington on 13 October.

== Filmography ==
Film
Year	Film	Role	Notes
1982	Made in Britain	Hopkins	
1983	Fords on Water	Winston's father	
1987	Sammy and Rosie Get Laid	Father	
Television
Year	Title	Role	Notes
1964	Theatre 625	Male nurse	One episode: "Women in Crisis #2: With Love and Tears"
1969	The Troubleshooters	Jerry	One episode: "This Place Is a Paradise, Mister"
1969	Dixon of Dock Green	Bus conductor	One episode: "Bobby"
1971	Softly, Softly	Mr. Gill	One episode: "Hostage"
1975	Shades of Greene	Waiter	One episode: "Cheaper in August"
1975	Quiller	Charlie 1	One Episode: "Objective Caribbean"
1976	Love Thy Neighbour	Electrician	One episode: "Power Cut"
1976	Spring & Autumn	Bus conductor	One episode: "Episode 3.1"
1977	The Professionals	Mr. Culver	One episode: "Klansmen"
1977	The Fosters	Lawrence	One episode: "The Diet"
1978	The Chiffy Kids	Stall Holder	One episode: "All in a Good Cause"
1979	Empire Road	Alvin	Four episodes: "Football Crazy", "Godfadder at Bay", "Streets of Thornley", and "Wedding"
1985	Black Silk	Pedro Ojo	Two episodes: "A Long Way Away", "The Cause of Liberty"
1986	Kit Curran	Ambulance mate	One episode: "The Lucky Break"
1987	Vanity Fair	Sam	Three episodes: "Miss Sharp and Miss Sedley Open the Campaign", "Vauxhall Gardens" and "Crawley of Queen's Crawley"
1992	Us Girls	Grandad Pinnock	12 episodes
1996	Bugs	Airport guard	One episode: "Whirling Dervish"
2003	Waking the Dead	Lawrence	One episode: "Final Cut: Part 1"
2005	The Bill	O'Ryan (1986) and Mr. Earle (2005)	Two episodes: "The Chief Super's Party" (1986) and "279" (2005)
2009	Doctor Who	Winston Katusi	One episode: "The End of Time (Part 1)"

== Stage ==
- 1973: "Tony" in Sweet Talk by Michael Abbensetts
- 1977: Come Jubilee by T-Bone Wilson; Bush Theatre
- 1977: "D'Coursey" in Say Hallelujah by Jimi Rand
- 1978: The School Leaver by Michael McMillan, at Royal Court Theatre
- 1981: "T.D" in In The Mood by Michael Abbensetts
- 1982: "Huston" / "Vince" in Where there Is Darkness by Caryl Phillips
- 1983: "Jim" in Two Can Play by Trevor Rhone
- 1984: "Claude" in El Dorado by Michael Abbensetts
- 1985: "A A Ablack" in The New Hardware Store by Earl Lovelace
- 1986: "P" in An Echo in the Bone by Dennis Scott
- 1987: "Albert Perez-Jordan" in Remembrance by Derek Walcott
- 1989: Choreography for A Rock in Water by Winsome Pinnock
- 1989: "Apa" in Take Back What's Yours by Jacqueline Rudet
- 1990: "Broderick" in Leave Taking by Winsome Pinnock, at the Lyric Theatre, Hammersmith
- 1994: "Driver" / "King" in Maskarade by Sylvia Wynter
