= Wayne Laryea =

British musician and television actor (born 1952)

- Born: Wayne Laryea; 11 April 1952 (age 74); London, England, United Kingdom
- Occupations: Actor; musician

Wayne Laryea (born 11 April 1952) is a British musician and television actor. Laryea is best known to American audiences for his role as the bumblebee Harmony in The Bugaloos (1970), and to British viewers as Johnny in Pipkins (1973). In 1978, Laryea featured in the BBC's first black drama series, Empire Road, and in Crown Court the same year as Bryon Whittaker.

== Early life ==
Laryea's father Nathanal was from Ghana and after seasons with the international dance group 'Ballet Negro' had copied his own theatre show as Chief Odongo called 'African Frenzy Show' touring the UK and Scandinavia. During his retirement, he took the fire eating and snake charming part of his show, created a famous cabaret act and worked in films. His daughter Vilma also went on to have a varied show and TV career.

== The Bugaloos ==
American television producers Sid and Marty Krofft sorted through 5,000 British applicants in 1970 to choose four young adult musicians for their new show The Bugaloos about an "all-insect rock group". 18 years old at the time, Laryea was chosen to play keyboards as the bumblebee character Harmony living with the other band members I.Q (a grasshopper guitarist), Joy (a singing butterfly) and Courage (a male ladybug who played drums) in the fictional Tranquillity Forest, "the last colony of the British empire." The Kroffts chose Laryea despite his black race, even though the state of Mississippi had recently banned Sesame Street for its portrayal of white and black children playing together. The Kroffts did not bring attention to the racial diversity on their show. Laryea was received well by the viewers who responded to his use of cockney-style rhyming slang and his physical comedy.

The Bugaloos premiered on 12 September 1970 in the Saturday-morning cartoon programming of American TV, aimed at a demographic of children 6 to 11 years old. Laryea and the other Bugaloos were brought to Hollywood to live together in a large house. For the show, they sang and played music, and they acted out the script along with other actors featuring Martha Raye as the villainous witch, and Billy Barty as a friendly firefly. An LP record of the Bugaloos music was released, but it was not a best-seller. The show struggled against other competitions in its time slot: Lancelot Link, Secret Chimp and Sabrina the Teenage Witch. The final episode aired on 2 January 1971; a total of 17 episodes had been taped.

== Empire Road ==
Empire Road (1978–9) was the first soap opera to feature black and Asian performers. Laryea played Marcus Bennett, one of the three main characters. The character Marcus was the son of Everton Bennett (Norman Beaton) and his wife Hortense (Corinne Skinner-Carter) who had come from Guyana to live in the UK. Marcus was born to them 20 years earlier in Birmingham; the show was set in the racially diverse Birmingham suburb of Handsworth. Another recurring character was Marcus's girlfriend Ranjanaa Kapoor, played by Guyanese beauty contestant Nalini Moonasar.

Michael Abbensetts was the main writer of the show. Empire Road initially aired at 6:50 pm on BBC 2. For its second season, BBC moved the show to the prime time slot of 8 pm. After 15 episodes and two years of broadcast, the show was cancelled.
