= Meantime (film) =

1983 British film

- DVD cover
- Written by: Mike Leigh
- Directed by: Mike Leigh
- Starring: Gary Oldman; Tim Roth; Alfred Molina
- Music by: Andrew Dickson
- Country of origin: United Kingdom
- Original language: English

Production
- Producer: Graham Benson
- Cinematography: Roger Pratt
- Editor: Lesley Walker
- Running time: 112 minutes
- Budget: £357,000

Original release
- Network: Channel 4
- Release: 1 December 1983

Meantime is a 1983 British comedy-drama television film directed by Mike Leigh and produced by Central Television for Channel 4. It stars Tim Roth, Phil Daniels, and Gary Oldman. It was shown in 1983 at the London Film Festival and on Channel 4 and at the 1984 Berlin International Film Festival. According to the critic Michael Coveney, "the sapping, debilitating and demeaning state of unemployment, the futile sense of waste, has not been more poignantly, or poetically, expressed in any other film of the period."

== Plot ==
The film unfolds in brief episodes, detailing the travails of the working-class Pollock family, who live in a shabby flat in a tower block in London's East End. They are struggling to stay afloat during the recession under Prime Minister Margaret Thatcher's premiership. Only the nagging, put-upon mother Mavis is working; the bitter, feckless father Frank and the couple's two sons Colin, an extremely shy young man, and Mark, his outspoken, headstrong older brother, are on the dole. Their aimless, querulous existence is contrasted with Mavis's sister Barbara and her husband John, whose financial and social loftiness in suburban Chigwell serves as a comfortable facade for their lacklustre marriage. The boys spend their time at home, on the street, at friends' flats, in the unemployment office, and at the local pub. Mark is continually scrounging for cash and cadging drinks from his friends, among them Coxy, a crude, impulsive skinhead. Colin has a crush on a sweet-natured girl named Hayley, but he can't bring himself to act upon it. Mark mocks his father, teases Colin by calling him "Kermit" and "Muppet," and makes insinuations about Barbara's troubled relationship with her husband. Barbara offers Colin a job helping her redecorate her home, but when Mark shows up, Colin withdraws, refuses to do any work, and finally leaves. When he returns home, he's had his head shaved.

== Cast ==
- Marion Bailey as Barbara
- Phil Daniels as Mark Pollock
- Tim Roth as Colin Pollock
- Pam Ferris as Mavis Pollock
- Jeffrey Robert as Frank Pollock
- Alfred Molina as John
- Gary Oldman as Coxy
- Tilly Vosburgh as Hayley
- Paul Daly as Rusty
- Leila Bertrand as Hayley's Friend
- Peter Wight as Estate Manager
- Eileen Davies as Unemployment Benefit Clerk
- Herbert Norville as Man in Pub

== Production ==
Filming locations in London included the areas of Chigwell, Woodford Green, and Trafalgar Square. The Pollock family flat was filmed at Bryant Court on Whiston Road, Haggerston, while Barbara and John’s house was filmed at 10 Gwynne Park Avenue, Woodford Bridge, London IG8 8AB. The unemployment office scene was filmed on Enfield Road and the canal scene was filmed on Dunston Road, Haggerston.

An incident occurred at the rehearsal space in a factory in Homerton, when Roth and Oldman were throwing a milk bottle around. Suddenly Roth threw it up and it hit a fluorescent lighting strip. Leigh saw "Gary's shaven head erupt into a thousand red blotches; in the film you can see the stitch marks." He rushed Oldman to hospital. "As I drove him there, all done up in his skinhead stuff, covered in blood, Gary said to me, 'For fuck's sake, tell 'em I'm an actor!' He could easily have lost his eyesight in the accident, and I do not know to this day what I would have done if that had happened."
