= Beatrix Mugishagwe =

Tanzanian film director

- Occupation: Film director
- Organization: TAIPA
- Title: Co-Founder of Abantu Visions

M. Beatrix Mugishagwe is a Tanzanian film director. She is the founder and CEO of Abantu Visions, Tanzania's first independent professional film and production company, and has chaired the Tanzania Independent Producers' Association (TAIPA).

== Life ==
Mugishagwe studied film-making in West Germany, working in television there for two decades, before returning to Tanzania in 1994. She established her production company, Abantu Vusions, with a 24-part environmental documentary series in Kiswahili. Another documentary series, Unsung Heroines: African Female Leaders, consisted of thirteen 26-minute films presented by Angélique Kidjo. The series profiled women such as Ellen Johnson Sirleaf, Graça Machel and Wangari Maathai.

Together with Imruh Bakari and lecturer Augustine Hatar, Mugishagwe cofounded the Tanzania Screenwriter's Forum in 2001, running a monthly scriptwriting workshop at the University of Dar es Salaam.

Mugishagwe's feature film Tumaini (2005) told the story of its eponymous child heroine, who has to fend for herself and her two siblings after their parents die of AIDS. The film received $400,000 of donor funding from the Norwegian embassy, who saw it as a vehicle for promoting orphanages for AIDS orphans. A declaration of love was inserted at the donors' insistence, in order to include a condom promotion. Despite, or because of, the tension between it being an effective fictional drama and an "issues" film, Tumaini won the Unicef Award and the SIGNIS award when it premiered at Zanzibar International Film Festival.

== Films ==
- Tumaini / Hope (2005)
