= Herbert Norville =

English film actor (born 1957)

- Born: 1957 (age 68–69); London, England
- Occupation: Actor

Herbert Norville (born 1957 in London) is a British actor known for his appearances in many classic films in the 1970s and '80s, including Scum (1979), Pressure (1976), Meantime (1983), Full Metal Jacket (1987) and Bugsy Malone (1976).

== Partial filmography ==
- Smudger (1972) - Borstal Boy
- Rumpole and the Confession of Guilt (1975) - Ossie Gladstone
- Bugsy Malone (1976) - Sarsaparilla Man
- Special Offer (1976) - Mickey
- Pressure (1976) - Anthony Watson
- The Boys and Mrs B (1977) - Nick
- Dinner at the Sporting Club (1978 BBC television play) - Elwyn
- Scum (1979) - Toyne
- Probation (1982 short film) - Arbley
- Meantime (1983) - Man in pub
- The Chain (1984) - Des
- Full Metal Jacket (1987) - Daytona Dave
- Wall of Tyranny (1988 TV Movie) - PFC Mason
- The Firm (1989 TV Movie) - Joe
