= Pipkins =

British children's television series (1973–1981)

- Also known as: Inigo Pipkin
- Created by: Michael Jeans; Susan Pleat
- Starring: George Woodbridge; Wayne Laryea; Jonathan Kydd; Nigel Plaskitt; Heather Tobias; Lorain Bertorelli; Elizabeth Lindsay; Anne Rutter; Alex Knight; Diana Eden; Paddy O'Hagan; Jumoke Debayo; Royce Mills; Charles McKeown; Preston Lockwood; Billy Hamon; Sue Nicholls; Janet Dale
- Country of origin: United Kingdom
- Original language: English
- No. of series: 10
- No. of episodes: 323 (200 missing, 5 incomplete)

Production
- Running time: 15 minutes
- Production company: ATV

Original release
- Network: ITV
- Release: 1 January 1973 – 29 December 1981

Pipkins (originally Inigo Pipkin) is a British children's television programme. Hartley Hare, Pig, Topov, Octavia and the gang were the stars of ATV's pre-school series which ran from 1 January 1973 to 29 December 1981.

Pipkins was one of the first children's programmes on British TV where the characters had regional accents: Pig had a Birmingham accent; Topov the monkey was a Cockney; Octavia the ostrich had a French accent; Pigeon had an Upper class English accent; Mrs Penguin had a Geordie accent; Uncle Hare had a West Country English accent; Sophie the cat had a non-regional English accent; and Moony the Badger had a Northern Ireland accent.

== Origins ==
In 1972, the ITV network expanded its daytime broadcasting hours and the Independent Broadcasting Authority commissioned four of the main ITV companies to each provide a series of interest to pre-schoolers, as an alternative to the successful US import Sesame Street. From this commission Thames Television came up with Rainbow, Yorkshire with Mister Trimble, Granada with Hickory House, while ATV's contribution would be Inigo Pipkin.

Inigo Pipkin was first shown on New Year's Day 1973. When the show started, the main character was an elderly puppet maker called Inigo Pipkin (hence the original title), played by George Woodbridge. The puppets were his creations, and over the course of the first series, viewers saw Inigo bring to life Hartley Hare and the Tortoise (a.k.a. George) played by Nigel Plaskitt; and Topov the monkey, Pig and Octavia the ostrich, all played by Heather Tobias.

However, Woodbridge died suddenly from a heart attack in March 1973, while recording of the second series was still taking place. Inigo Pipkin was not recorded in the order it was transmitted, and Woodbridge had only completed taping of the latter episodes. The scripts for the episodes that would be broadcast first in the transmission run, i.e. those that Woodbridge had not managed to record, were thus hastily rewritten, with Inigo's absence explained by his being away on a fishing holiday.

In 1974, in a first for children's television, the death of Inigo was worked into the programme, predating the Mr Hooper episode on Sesame Street by nine years. From this episode onwards, the show was renamed Pipkins and Inigo's assistant, Johnny (Wayne Laryea), took over. The storyline for this episode was unfolded with remarkable compassion. The puppets, alongside their young viewers, were guided through the experience of loss and grief, learning that, although Mr Pipkin was no longer with them, his love and teachings would endure. The decision to embrace such a difficult subject within the format of a children's programme was a radical choice, particularly at a time when death was largely considered a taboo topic for young audiences.

After Woodbridge's death, the direction of the programme had to change; from here on, the show ceased to centre around a puppet workshop and the characters became the 'Help People', helping anyone in need of a hand. Similarly, another episode "Death of a Goldfish" dealt with the topic of death, in regards to losing a pet. Topov the monkey and Johnny discussed why the goldfish died and why people die.

Johnny left Pipkins around 1978, to be replaced by Tom (Jonathan Kydd), who moved on in 1980, his place taken by Peter Potter (Paddy O'Hagan). In later years Sue Nicholls made regular appearances as the Pipkins' neighbour, Mrs Muddle. The name was somewhat ironic as she was always a calming, self-assured presence around the puppets.

The familiar workshop set was replaced in 1979 (in the story "Moving Out"), with new interiors based around a kitchen and backyard. The new set was built up from ground level to enable puppeteers to work standing up and to move around more freely, modelled on the methods used by The Muppet Show which was also filmed at ATV Elstree Studios.

== Cancellation ==
Pipkins ended when ATV lost its franchise for the Midlands ITV region, was restructured and became Central Independent Television. The programme was replaced by Let's Pretend.

The series was made at ATV Elstree Studios, with occasional filming on location. For the Inigo Pipkin episodes, the opening and closing titles were sung by Jackie Lee, who had earlier sung the themes to children's programmes The Adventures of Rupert Bear and White Horses.

Unusually for a children's programme, there was no spin-off Pipkins merchandise (toys, games, books etc.) produced during the programme's run.

== Archive status ==
In common with other 1970s shows, a number of Pipkins episodes recorded on 625 line PAL colour videotape – including the very first Inigo Pipkin — are missing from the archives (poor storage of former ATV master colour videotapes has led to the loss of many shows), and not even any 16mm black-and-white film copies of the lost episodes exist.

Out of a total of 323 episodes, only 123 complete episodes have survived, while sequences exist for five partially lost episodes. The other 200 episodes no longer exist in any format, while ten others exist on 625 line PAL colour videotape masters, domestic videocassette recordings for 113 episodes in various formats. Nigel Plaskitt — who provided the show's narration, as well as voicing and operating Hartley and Tortoise – made off-air domestic videocassette recordings of around 65 episodes, now the only format in which these are known to exist.

== Home media ==
Several DVD's have been released by Network, comprising the surviving episodes. Volume 1 was released on 25th April 2005, which featured 10 assorted episodes. Subsequently, Volume 2 was released on 26th September 2006, which included 10 assorted episodes respectively and an excerpt of the partially missing episode "On the Canal", Volume 3 was released on 16th May 2008, which comprised 16 episodes and an excerpt of the partially missing episode "It's Not Fair", Volume 4, was released on 9th November 2015, which encompassed 22 episodes, and Volume 5, entitled "The Collection", which was released on 28th August 2017 and encompassed all of the previous four volumes. Kaleidoscope released another 18 disc boxset on 18th November 2023, which featured every surviving episode in the archives, including several episodes not previously included in earlier Network releases.

== Cast ==
Role	Actor
Inigo Pipkin (1973–1974)	George Woodbridge
Narrator; Hartley Hare; Tortoise (1973–1981); Uncle Hare; Angus McHare; Mooney; The Eccentric Detective	Nigel Plaskitt
Pig (1973; 1975–1977); Topov (1973); Tortoise (1973, first series only); Octavia (1973; 1975–1978); The Bag Lady	Heather Tobias
Pig (1974–1975); Octavia (1974-1975; 1977); Topov (1974–1978); Pigeon	Lorain Bertorelli
Pig (1977–1978); Topov (1978–1981); Octavia (1978–1981)	Elizabeth Lindsay
Pig (1978–1981); Sophie the Cat	Anne Rutter
Pig (1981)	Alex Knight
Mrs P, The Penguin	Diana Eden
Johnny (1973–1978)	Wayne Laryea
Bertha	Jumoke Debayo
Tom (1978–1980)	Jonathan Kydd
Peter Potter (1980–1981)	Paddy O'Hagan
Fred Pipkin	Royce Mills
Charlie, the Dustman	Charles McKeown
The Old Gentleman	Preston Lockwood
The Genie	Billy Hamon
Mrs Muddle (1980–1981)	Sue Nicholls
Granny	Janet Dale

== Episodes ==
1. Trifle
