= Michael Abbensetts =

British playwright and screenwriter (1938–2016)

- Born: Michael John Abbensetts; 8 June 1938; Georgetown, British Guiana
- Died: 24 November 2016 (aged 78); London, England
- Education: Queen's College; Stanstead College; Sir George Williams University
- Occupation: Playwright
- Notable work: Sweet Talk; Empire Road
- Children: 1 daughter

Michael John Abbensetts (8 June 1938 – 24 November 2016) was a Guyana-born British writer who settled in England in the 1960s. He had been described as "the best Black playwright to emerge from his generation, and as having given "Caribbeans a real voice in Britain". He was the first black British playwright commissioned to write a television drama series, Empire Road, which the BBC aired from 1978 to 1979.

== Early years ==
Born in Georgetown, British Guiana (now Guyana), the son of Neville John (a doctor) and Elaine Abbensetts, Michael Abbensetts attended Queen's College from 1952 to 1956, then Stanstead College, Quebec, Canada, and Sir George Williams University, in Montreal (1960–61), before moving to England "around 1963". He became a British citizen in 1974.

== Writing career ==
Although Abbensetts began his writing career with short stories, he had been attracted to playwriting after seeing a performance of John Osborne's Look Back In Anger in Montreal, while studying at university there, thereafter deciding to move to London to become a writer. Abbensetts's work in stage drama debuted in 1973 at the Royal Court Theatre Upstairs with his play Sweet Talk, which was directed by Stephen Frears and had a cast including Mona Hammond, Don Warrington, Allister Bain, Sally Watts and Joan-Ann Maynard. Abbensetts became the Royal Court's resident dramatist, and Sweet Talk won the George Devine Award, shared with Mustafa Matura. Soon afterwards, Abbensetts had his first television play broadcast on BBC2; titled The Museum Attendant, the play was inspired by his own experience of having worked as a security guard at the Tower of London in the mid-1960s. His next television play for the BBC, Black Christmas, aired in 1977 and was also directed by Frears, being described in The Stage as "totally mature… beautifully constructed". Stephen Bourne has called it "one of the best television dramas of the 1970s".

From the 1970s to 1990s, Abbensetts continued his theatre career throughout London. His works during this time period included Alterations (premiered in 1978 at the New End Theatre in Hampstead, featuring Don Warrington), Samba (at the Tricycle Theatre in 1980, with Norman Beaton), The Outlaw (1983), and The Lion (1993).

Later, Abbensetts won the 2004 Alfred Fagon Award for his play The Good Doctor's Son.

In 2025, a production of Alterations (with additional material by Trish Cooke) was staged at the Royal National Theatre.

Apart from plays, Abbensetts was a screenwriter for Empire Road (BBC, 1978–79), produced by Peter Ansorge, and considered British television's first Black soap opera, although Abbensetts said: "I never really liked it being called a Soap. It was The Daily Mail that called it that. I always thought of it as a drama series, where each episode had a separate story." The second series was directed by Horace Ové, "establishing a production unit with a Black director, Black writer and Black actors." The cast featured Norman Beaton, Corinne Skinner-Carter, Joseph Marcell, Rudolph Walker and Wayne Laryea.

In the early 1980s, Abbensetts was a member of independent production company Penumbra Productions, together with Horace Ové, H. O. Nazareth, and a number of other black creatives among whom were Lindsay Barrett, Margaret Busby, Farrukh Dhondy and Mustapha Matura. Other television projects by Abbensetts include Easy Money (with Norman Beaton again in the lead, 1982), Big George Is Dead (Channel 4, 1987), starring Beaton, Linzi Drew and Ram John Holder, and the mini-series Little Napoleons (1994, Channel 4, the cast including Beaton, Saeed Jaffrey, Lesley Manville and Simon Callow). The last television script Abbensetts wrote was for an episode of the television series Doctors, entitled "Vanessa's World", aired on 16 October 2001.

== Teaching and fellowships ==
In 1983–84, Abbensetts was Visiting Professor of Drama at Carnegie-Mellon University. From September 2002, he was a Project Fellow in the Caribbean Studies Department of the University of North London (now London Metropolitan University). He was a Fellow at City and Guilds of London Art School, 2006–09.

== Later years and personal life ==
With Abbensetts' health declining in his latter years as a result of Alzheimer's disease, a tribute was organised for his benefit by Anton Phillips on Sunday, 9 December 2012: a rehearsed reading of Sweet Talk, directed by Phillips and attended by Abbensetts himself, was held at the Tricycle Theatre, with many well known figures in Black theatre and arts in the audience, including Yvonne Brewster, Don Warrington, Rudolph Walker, Oscar James, Allister Bain and Errol Lloyd.

Abbensetts died aged 78 on 24 November 2016, survived by his daughter, Justine, from his relationship with Anne Stewart, and by two grandchildren, Sean and Danielle, as well as a sister Elizabeth. His first wife Connie, a lawyer, had died of cancer towards the end of the 1980s, and in 2005 Abbensetts married Liz Bluett, although they later separated.

== Recognition and legacy ==
A portrait of Michael Abbensetts by Horace Ové is in the Photographs Collection of the National Portrait Gallery, London.

A property that Abbensetts bought in 1990 in Kilburn, London, where he lived for 16 years and wrote the series Little Napoleons for Channel 4, was chosen as the location for a Nubian Jak Community Trust blue plaque honouring him.

== Selected works ==
=== Stage plays ===
- Sweet Talk (two acts), produced at the Theatre at New End, 1973.
- Alterations, produced at the New End Theatre, 1978.
- Samba (two acts), produced at the Tricycle Theatre, 1980.
- In the Mood (two acts), produced at the Hampstead Theatre, 1981.
- The Outlaw, produced at the Arts Theatre, 1983.
- El Dorado, produced at the Theatre Royal Stratford East, 1984.
- The Lion, produced at the Cochrane Theatre, 1993.
- The Good Doctor's Son, 2003/4.

=== Television plays ===
- The Museum Attendant, BBC2, 1973
- Inner City Blues, 1974;
- Crime and Passion, 1975;
- Roadrunner, 1977;
- Black Christmas, BBC, 1977.
- Empire Road, series, BBC, 1978–79.
- Easy Money, BBC2 Playhouse, 1982.
- Big George Is Dead, Channel 4, 1987.
- Little Napoleons, mini-series, Channel 4, 1994.

=== Radio plays ===
- Sweet Talk, BBC Radio, 1974.
- Home Again, BBC Radio, 1975.
- The Sunny Side of the Street, BBC Radio, 1977.
- Brothers of the Sword, BBC Radio, 1978.
- Alterations, BBC World Service, 1980.
- The Fast Lane, Capital Radio, 1980.
- The Dark Horse, BBC Radio, 1981.

== Bibliography ==
- Sweet Talk, London: Methuen, 1974.
- Empire Road (novelisation of TV series), London: Grenada, 1979.
- Four Plays (Sweet Talk; Alterations; In the Mood; El Dorado), London: Oberon Books, 2001. ISBN 9781840021790
