= H. O. Nazareth =

British filmmaker and barrister (born 1944)

- Born: Hubert Oscar Nazareth; 1944 (age 81–82); Bombay, British India
- Other name: Naz
- Education: University of Kent
- Occupations: Filmmaker, writer, journalist and barrister
- Movement: British Black Panthers

Hubert Oscar Nazareth "Naz" Nazareth (born 1944) is a British filmmaker, writer, journalist and barrister based in London, England. He was co-founder of the film production company Penumbra.

== Early life ==
Born in Bombay, British India, of Goan descent, Hubert Oscar Nazareth at the age of 21 in 1965 went to Britain, where he worked at various jobs, including as a computer programmer. He went on to study philosophy and politics at the University of Kent, and qualified as a barrister. Nazareth experienced racist treatment in searching for work in the UK, and after witnessing the way police harassed his Afro-Caribbean friends while they left him alone he joined the British Black Panther movement.

== Career ==
As well as writing and performing poetry in London, Nazareth worked as a journalist contributing to the radical political magazine The Leveller and to Time Out, where he was later a member of the group that set up the alternative listings magazine City Limits in 1981.

After interviewing Trinidadian director Horace Ové for The Leveller, Nazareth co-wrote with him the script of the television film The Garland (1981), which led to the creation of an independent production company named Penumbra. Alongside Ové and Nazareth, other members of Penumbra Productions included Michael Abbensetts, Lindsay Barrett, Margaret Busby, Farrukh Dhondy, and Mustapha Matura. In 1983, Penumbra Productions made a 60-minute film, Talking History (directed by Nazareth), featuring C. L. R. James in dialogue with E. P. Thompson, and Penumbra also filmed a series of six of James's lectures, shown on Channel 4 television, the topics being: Shakespeare; cricket; American society; Solidarity in Poland; the Caribbean; and Africa.

Nazareth was producer of the magazine show Sunday East for Channel 4 in the 1980s. He and director Faris Kermani formed the company Azad Productions (1984–1989) with a focus on programmes for people from the Indian subcontinent, such as in 1986 the television documentaries A Fearful Silence in 1986 (about domestic violence in the Asian community), and A Corner of a Foreign Field (directed by Udayan Prasad) on the lives of Pakistanis in the UK. Among the films Nazareth has produced are Suffer the Children (1988, on apartheid South Africa), Doctors and Torture (1990, about medical involvement in torture in Latin America), China Rocks: The Long March of Cui Jian (1991); Bombay and Jazz (1992), and Stories My Country Told Me, on culture and nationalism.

Also a poet, Nazareth published a poetry collection, entitled Lobo, in 1984. In addition to writing for The Leveller, as a journalist he has written for such publications as the New Statesman, New African and Marxism Today. He is a contributor to Reflected in Water: Writings on Goa (Penguin India, 2006), edited by Jerry Pinto.

== Selected filmography ==
- 1981: The Garland (BBC, Play for Today) – co-writer with Horace Ové
- 1983: Caribbean (featuring C. L. R. James) – producer
- 1983: Talking History (featuring C. L. R. James and E. P. Thompson) – director, producer, researcher
- 1983: Cricket (featuring C. L. R. James) – producer
- 1983: American Society (featuring C. L. R. James) – producer
- 1985: Music Fusion (featuring Imdad Husain and Khomiso Khan) – producer
- 1985: Africa (featuring C. L. R. James) – producer
- 1985: Khomiso Khan at Camden Lock – producer
- 1985: Shakespeare (featuring C. L. R. James) – producer
- 1986: A Corner of a Foreign Field (Channel 4) – producer
- 1988: Suffer the Children (BBC) – producer
- 1990: Doctors and Torture (BBC Inside Story series) – producer
- 1991: China Rocks: The Long March of Cui Jian – producer
- 1991: Repomen – producer
- 1992: Bombay and Jazz (BBC) – writer and director
- 1993: The Curry Boys – producer
- 1993: Gone to the Dogs – producer
- 1996: Stories My Country Told Me – director
