= Zak Ové =

British-Trinidad visual artist (born 1966)

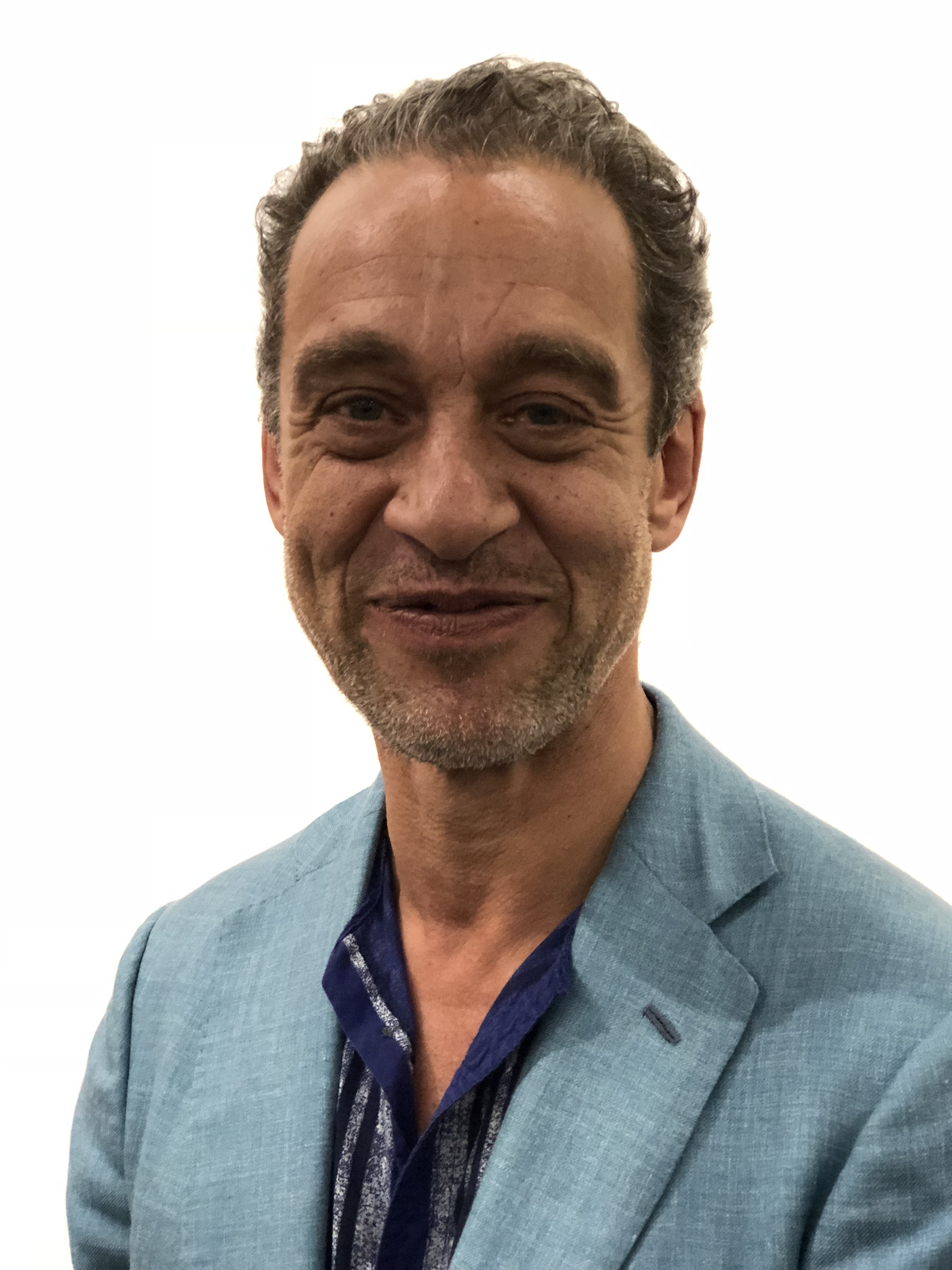
- Ové in 2018
- Born: 1966 (age 59–60); London, UK
- Education: St. Martin's School of Art
- Occupation: Visual artist
- Parent: Horace Ové (father)
- Relatives: Indra Ové (sister)
- Website: www.zak-ove.co.uk

Zak Ové (born 1966) is a British-Trinidadian artist working in sculpture, photography, film and installation. His practice engages with diasporic histories and traditions of masking and masquerade, particularly in relation to Trinidadian carnival. He has exhibited internationally, including in museum and public contexts in Europe, the United States and Africa. His father is the filmmaker Horace Ové and his sister is the actress Indra Ové.

== Biography ==
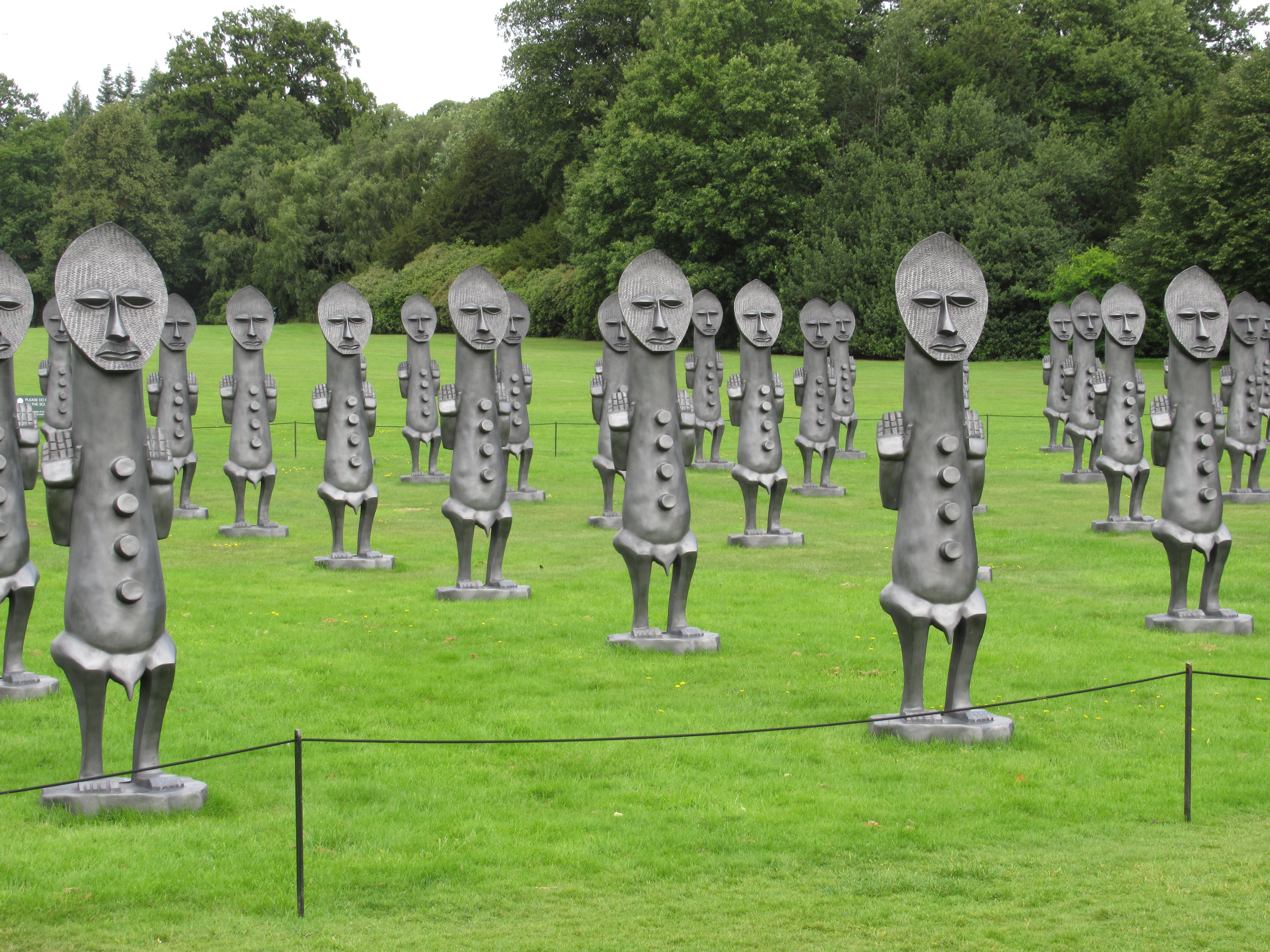
Black and Blue: The Invisible Man and the Masque of Blackness, Yorkshire Sculpture Park

Born in London, UK, Zak Ové throughout his teens assisted his father Horace Ové on numerous film shoots, before earning a BA in Film as Fine Art from St. Martin's School of Art (1984–87). Ové provided the video for the segment "Begin the Beguine" performed by Salif Keita on Red Hot + Blue, a 1990 compilation album featuring contemporary pop performers reinterpreting songs of Cole Porter.

In July 2015, Ové's "Moko Jumbie" sculptures, commissioned to tie in with the Notting Hill Carnival and inspired by aspects of African masquerade, were installed in the Great Court at the British Museum as part of the Celebrating Africa exhibition there, before ultimately being moved to the Africa Galleries, with Ové as the first Caribbean artist to enter the museum’s permanent collection. In March 2017, Ové's Moko Jumbie figures were installed at the British Museum as part of the Sainsbury African Galleries, the first time in the museum's history that the work of a Caribbean sculptor has been on permanent display in the African collection.

In October 2016, his installation Black and Blue: The Invisible Man and the Masque of Blackness, comprising an "army" of 40 two-metre-high graphite statues, was assembled in the courtyard of Somerset House, where the 1:54 Contemporary African Art Fair was taking place. The journal Art Radar described Ové's work as "one of the standouts of the fair", and the Financial Times reported that it had quickly found a buyer: "Modern Forms, a contemporary art platform founded by Hussam Otaibi, managing partner of the investment group Floreat, and Nick Hackworth, the curator who previously ran London’s Paradise Row gallery, bought one of three editions of the 40 identical, life-size sculptures of Nubian masked men, priced at £300,000, through London’s Vigo gallery. The plan is for Ové's installation to be part of a sculpture park that Modern Forms is creating at a property in Berkshire." Ové's Black and Blue: The Invisible Man and the Masque of Blackness is part of a series of new open-air displays celebrating the 40th anniversary of the Yorkshire Sculpture Park.

Ové curated the major exhibition Get Up, Stand Up Now: Generations of Black Creative Pioneers mounted at Somerset House from 12 June to 15 September 2019, celebrating "the past 50 years of Black creativity in Britain and beyond ... spanning art, film, photography, music, literature, design and fashion". Described by Ové as "a review and a celebration of our Caribbean and African culture that has permeated and contributed to British society", and taking its starting point as the radical work of his father Horace Ové, the exhibition showcased interdisciplinary contributions from 100 Black creatives, including Armet Francis, Black Audio Film Collective, Charlie Phillips, Dennis Bovell, Ebony G. Patterson, Gaika, Glenn Ligon, Hank Willis Thomas, Hassan Hajjaj, Jenn Nkiru, Larry Achiampong, Margaret Busby, Ronan McKenzie, Vanley Burke, Yinka Shonibare, Denzil Forrester, Martine Rose, Grace Wales Bonner, Steve McQueen, Betye Saar, Zadie Smith, among others.

== Solo exhibitions ==
- 2008: Black & White Nudes, Carte Blanche Gallery, London
- 2009: Blue Devils, Real Art Ways Museum, Connecticut, US
- 2010: Past Future, Fine Art Society, London
- 2010: Twice Is Too Much, The Freies Museum, Berlin
- 2013–14: Speaker, Vigo Gallery, London
- 2014: Arms Around The Child, No1 Mayfair, London

== Group exhibitions ==
- 2009: Encomium, Fine Art Society, London
- 2009: Encounters of Bamako, Panafrican Exhibition, National Museum, Bamako, Mali
- 2009: Rockstone and Bootheel, Real Art Ways, Connecticut
- 2010: Africa: See You, See Me, Museu da Cidade, Lisbon
- 2010: Encounters of Bamako, B-Gallery European Centre for Contemporary Art, Brussels
- 2010: Encounters of Bamako, Johannesburg Art Gallery, Johannesburg
- 2010: Encounters of Bamako, Panafrican Exhibition tour, Foto Museum, Antwerp
- 2010: Encounters of Bamako, South African National Gallery, Cape Town
- 2010: Fesman 2010: World Festival of Black Arts, Dakar, Senegal
- 2010: Hell’s Half Acre, Lazarides Gallery, London
- 2010: Tough Love, Plataforma Revólver, Lisbon
- 2010: We Are Not Witches, The Saatchi Gallery, London
- 2011: Africa See You See me, Li – Space, Beijing
- 2011: Africa: See You, See Me, Fondazione Studio Maragoni, Florence
- 2011: Africa: See You, See Me, Officine Fotografiche, Rome
- 2011: Carnaval and Masquerade, Musée Dapper, Paris
- 2011: Encounters of Bamako, Fundacao Calouste Gulbenkian, Lisbon
- 2011: Fine Art Society, London Art Fair, London
- 2011: Fine Arts Society, Volta NY, New York
- 2011: Go Tell it To The Mountain, 3D Sculpture Park, Verbier, Switzerland
- 2011: Karen Jenkins Johnson Gallery, Texas contemporary fair, Houston
- 2011: LA Platform, Karen Jenkins Johnson Gallery, Los Angeles
- 2011: Sculpture today – New Forces New Forms, Frederik Meijer Sculpture Park, Michigan
- 2011: Stephen Burks | Are You A Hybrid, Museum of Art and Design, New York
- 2011: The Minotaur, Lazarides Gallery, Old Vic Tunnels, London
- 2011: The Return Of The House Of The Nobleman, The House of the Nobleman, London
- 2012: British, Vigo Gallery, London
- 2012: London Twelve, City of Prague Museum, Czech Republic
- 2012: New Re-Visions, House of The Nobleman, London, UK
- 2012: The Future Can Wait – Charlie Smith, London, UK
- 2012: Vigo Gallery, London Art Fair, London
- 2012: Vigo Gallery, London Art Fair, London
- 2012: Voices of Home, Jenkins Johnson Gallery, New York
- 2012; Ululation, Vigo Gallery, London, UK
- 2013: 1:54 Contemporary African Art Fair, Somerset House, London
- 2013: Glasstress: White Light / White Heat, Venice Biennale, Venice
- 2013–14: Chaos Into Clarity: Re-Possessing a Funktioning Utopia, Sharjah Art Foundation, Dubai
- 2014: ART14, London (February–March)
- 2014: House of Barnabas, London (March)
- 2015: d'Assemblages” Dapper Museum, Paris
- 2016: 1:54 Contemporary African Art Fair, Somerset House, London
- 2016: Untitled Art Fair, Miami
- 2019: Get Up, Stand Up Now; Generations of Black Creative Pioneers, Somerset House, London

== See also ==
- Invisible Man and the Masque of Blackness
