= Henry G. Martin =

British independent filmmaker (1952–2022)

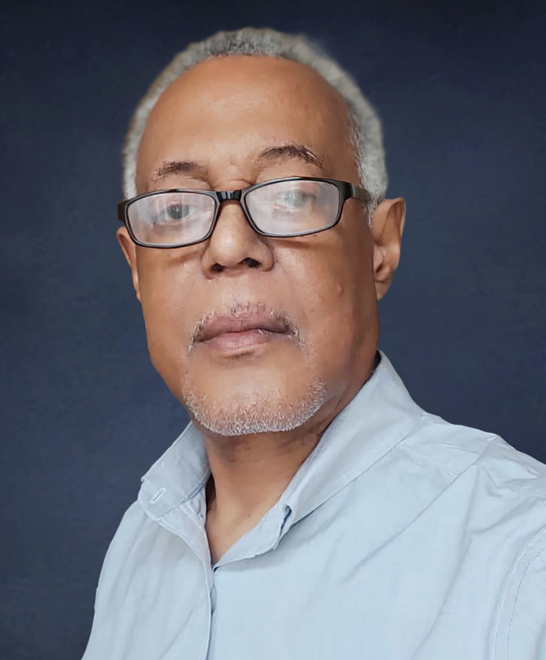
- Born: Henry Goule Martin; 3 April 1952; Lewisham, London, England
- Died: 13 May 2022 (aged 70); Hampstead, London, England
- Resting place: Highgate Cemetery, London
- Education: West Surrey College of Art and Design
- Occupations: Film director and producer
- Notable work: Grove Music (1981), Big George is Dead (1987)
- Children: 4
- Relatives: Tony Martin (brother)

Henry Goule Martin (3 April 1952 – 13 May 2022) was a British independent filmmaker in the 1980s and early 1990s. In addition to directing and producing films, he is known for starting the production company Kuumba in 1982 along with filmmakers Menelik Shabazz and Imruh Bakari, which later led to the founding of the noted Ceddo Film and Video Workshop.

== Early life ==
Henry Goule Martin was born at Lewisham Hospital, southeast London on 3 April 1952, to Trinidadian parents Claude and Vida Martin. When Martin was three months old, he returned with his parents to Port of Spain, Trinidad and Tobago. He spent his formative years immersed in Carnival culture in the Woodbrook neighbourhood of western Port of Spain. He discovered his connection to Pan-African ideology among this creative arts scene and the city's anti-colonial street culture. Martin returned to England in the early 1970s and studied film at the West Surrey College of Art and Design, Farnham.

== Ceddo Film and Video Workshop ==
Martin worked closely with Ceddo as a producer and mentor. For example, he established Screenwrite (1993), a prominent screenplay programme for Black writers, in association with the British Film Institute and Channel 4 Television. The production company Kuumba Black Arts (founded earlier in the same year as Ceddo) paved the way for its inception and position at the centre of radical Black filmmaking in London throughout the 1980s and 1990s. Some of the films produced by the workshop include Milton Bryan's The People’s Account (1985); Shabazz's Step Forward Youth (1977), Blood Ah Go Run (1982), and Time and Judgement: Diaries of a 400 Year Exile (1988); the late D. Elmina Davies’ Omega Rising: Women of Rastafari (1988); Bakari's Blue Notes and Exiled Voices (1991) and The Mark of the Hand (1987).

== Film and television work ==
While remaining devoted to Black independent film, Martin also worked in the broader British film industry, for example, directing a season of Everybody Here, an early 1980s children's television programme presented by the poet Michael Rosen.

Martin directed a number of his own films and documentaries in the 1980s, depicting Afro-Caribbean street culture and politics in Britain. He would eventually leave filmmaking due to allegations from the film industry that Grove Music supported violent confrontations between the racist police and the Black community. After the release of Big George is Dead, Martin decided to retire from filmmaking, feeling that seeking the support of the film industry would betray his independence and radicalism.

Martin's role	Film	Year
Director	Grove Carnival	1981
Director	Grove Music	1981
Producer	Grenada- Is Freedom We Making?	1983
Director & Producer	Trinidad and Tobago - Money Is Not the Problem	1983
Director	Big George is Dead	1987

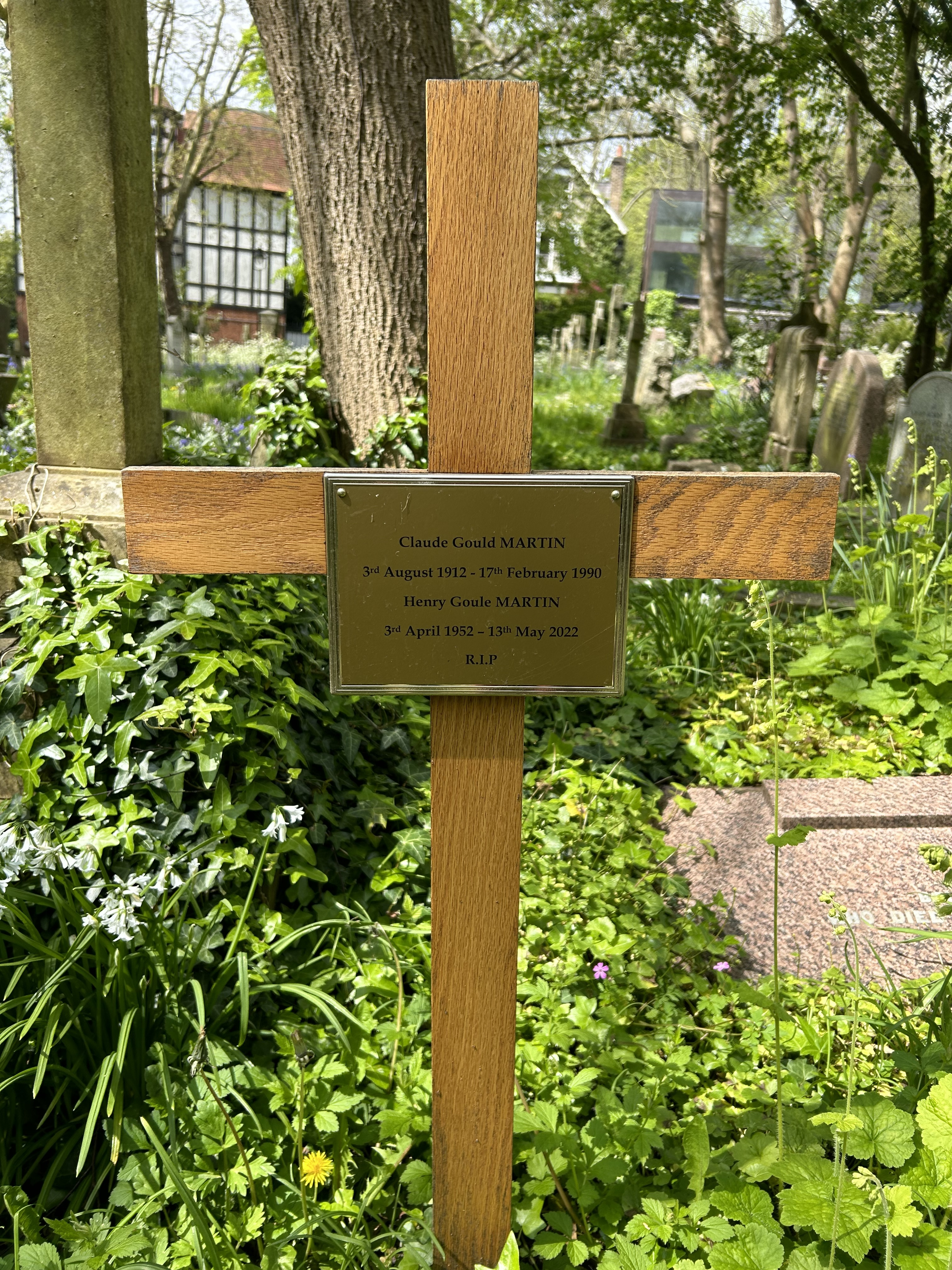
Grave of Henry G. Martin in Highgate Cemetery

== Personal life and death ==
With his former wife, Shirley, Martin had a son and daughter. With his partner, Paula Spencer, he had two sons. Martin died from lung cancer at a hospice in Hampstead, London, on 13 May 2022, aged 70. Paula and his children survived him. He was the brother of scholar Professor Tony Martin (1942–2013).
