= Imruh Bakari =

Filmmaker and writer born in St Kitts (born 1950)

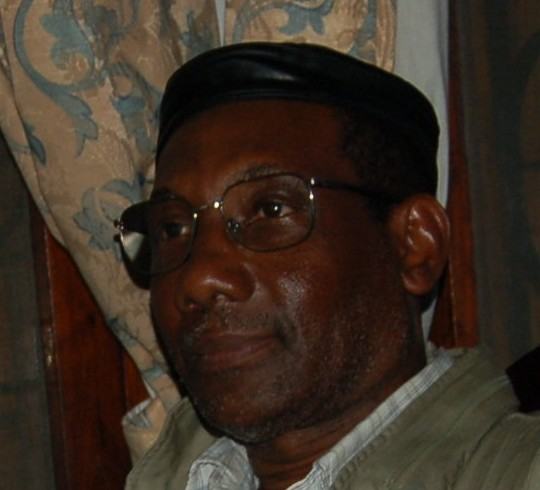
- Born: 1950 (age 75–76); St Kitts
- Other names: Imruh Bakari Caesar; Imruh Caesar
- Education: National Film and Television School
- Occupations: Film maker and writer
- Notable work: Riots and Rumours of Riots (1981); Mark of the Hand (1986)

Imruh Bakari (Ishaq Imruh Bakari) is a film maker and writer born in 1950 on St Kitts, who is also referred to as Imruh Bakari Caesar or Imruh Caesar. He currently teaches Film Studies at the University of Winchester. He works in the UK and a number of African countries in the area of culture and the creative industries.

== Film and TV work ==
Bakari worked in film and theatre projects in Bradford at the Art College and then attended the UK National Film and Television School. His graduation film was Riots and Rumours of Riots in 1981. This documented the history of immigration from the Caribbean to the UK from the Second World War until the 1958 Notting Hill riots. The film looked at that period against the background of the 1981 riots in the UK.

He worked with Menelik Shabazz on Step Forward Youth (1974), which documented the lives of black youth in Britain, and in 1982 on Burning an Illusion and the short Blood Ah Go Run. Bakari formed Kuumba Productions with Menelik Shabazz and Henry Martin, and was a founder member of Ceddo Film and Video Workshop, an outlet for new young, primarily black, talent. Bakari produced I Am Not Two Islands (1983) for Channel 4.

He then made Street Warriors in 1985, and The Mark of the Hand in 1986 for the Arts Council of Great Britain on the work of Caribbean artist Aubrey Williams. The latter "was a pioneering work and to this day, sympathetic and sensitive documentary film studies of Black British artists, such as Mark of the Hand, remain a rarity. One hugely important aspect of the film is the exploration of Williams’ respect and fondness for the indigenous peoples of the Guyana interior. In this regard, the film positively complicates and challenges assumed notions of Caribbean identity."

In 1992, Bakari directed Blue Notes and Exiled Voices, about the experiences of exiled South African musicians during the apartheid era, featuring Hugh Masekela, the Brotherhood of Breath, Louis Moholo and Pinise Saul.

Between 1999 and 2004 Bakari was Festival Director for the Zanzibar International Film Festival. In Tanzania, together with Beatrix Mugishagwe and lecturer Augustine Hatar, he cofounded the Tanzania Screenwriter's Forum in 2001, running a monthly scriptwriting workshop at the University of Dar es Salaam. Bakari also participated in the industry organisation, the Tanzania Independent Producers Association (TAIPA). Between 2005 and 2008, he produced in Tanzania the short film series African Tales. He was the producer of Mwalimu – The Legacy of Julius Kambarage Nyerere (Mnet, Great Africans Series, 2009).

== Favourite films ==
In 2022, Bakari participated in the Sight & Sound film polls of that year. It is held every ten years to select the greatest films of all time, by asking contemporary directors to select ten films of their choice.

Bakari's selections were:

- Napoléon (1927)
- Bicycle Thieves (1948)
- Pather Panchali (1955)
- Black Girl (1966)
- The Battle of Algiers (1966)
- The Godfather (1972)
- Mirror (1972)
- West Indies: The Fugitive Slaves of Liberty (1979)
- La Rue Cases-Nègres (1983)
- Hyènes (1992)

== Theatrical work ==
He has acted and directed in the theatre. During the 1970s, he worked at the Keskidee Arts Centre, where his performances included the lead role in the first production of Alem Mezgebe's Pulse in 1977, directed by Rufus Collins. In 1985, Bakari worked on Compound Images, Coming Up for Air, and The Balmyard in 1986 with Don Kinch's Staunch Poets and Players.

== Writing ==
Bakari writes on African and Caribbean cinema and the creative industries. His articles have appeared in publications including the 1993 and 1994 Ecrans d'Afrique, Screen, Black Filmmaker and Black Film Bulletin. He is the joint editor, with Mbye Cham, of African Experiences of Cinema. In 1996, he wrote "Memory and Identity in Caribbean Cinema" for New Formations.

He has also published the collections of poetry Sounds & Echoes (Karnak House, 1981), Secret Lives (Bogle-L'Ouverture Publications, 1986), and Without Passport or Apology (Smokestack Books, 2017). He has performed his work on London's Southbank Centre.

== Bibliography ==
- Sounds & Echoes – poetry (Karnak House, 1981)
- Secret Lives – poetry (Bogle-L'Ouverture Publications, 1986)
- Without Passport or Apology – poetry (Smokestack Books, 2017)

== Selected filmography ==
- Riots and Rumours of Riots (1981)
- Street Warriors (1985)
- The Mark of the Hand (1986)
- Blue Notes and Exiled Voices (1992), director
- Mwalimu – The Legacy of Julius Kambarage Nyerere (2009), producer
