= Frank Singuineau =

Trinidadian actor (1913–1992)

- Publicity still, 1950s
- Born: 4 August 1913; Port of Spain, Trinidad and Tobago
- Died: 11 September 1992 (aged 79); London, England
- Occupation: Actor

Francis Ethelbert Dominic Singuineau (4 August 1913 – 11 September 1992) was a Trinidadian actor of stage and screen who worked in the United Kingdom, where he moved from Trinidad and Tobago in the 1940s.

== Early life ==
Singuineau was born on 4 August 1913 in Port of Spain, Trinidad and Tobago.

== Career ==
His stage career began in amateur dramatics while he was employed by the Shell Company. Just after the Second World War, he gave up his job with Shell, travelled to London and became a professional actor, appearing at the Unity Theatre and the Bristol Old Vic. His London stage debut was in 1948 in Richard Wright's Native Son (1948). His acting career spanned the subsequent decades until his last roles in Lillian Hellman's Watch on the Rhine at the Royal National Theatre and Mustapha Matura's Playboy of the West Indies at the Tricycle Theatre in 1984.

Singuineau was also cast in several film roles, including in The Pumpkin Eater, Séance on a Wet Afternoon, Pressure and An American Werewolf in London. Among the television series to which he contributed were Z-Cars, Crane, and Doomwatch.

Singuineau retired in the mid-1980s.

== Death ==
He died on 11 September 1992 in London. He was 79 years old.

== Filmography ==
- Simba (1955) - Waweru
- I Am a Camera (1955) - Clive's Party Guest (uncredited)
- Storm Over the Nile (1955) - Native Servant
- Safari (1956) - African
- The Heart Within (1957) - Bobo
- Man from Tangier (1957) - Montez
- The Heart of a Man (1959) - Louis (uncredited)
- The Nun's Story (1959) - Murderer of Sister Aurelie (uncredited)
- The Mummy (1959) - Head Porter
- Tommy the Toreador (1959) - Sailor (uncredited)
- Peeping Tom (1960) - Electrician #1 (uncredited)
- Night of the Eagle (1962) - Truck Driver (uncredited)
- Guns of Darkness (1962) - Drummer-Nightclub (uncredited)
- Dr. No (1962) - Hotel Waiter (uncredited)
- The Pumpkin Eater (1964) - King of Israel
- Séance on a Wet Afternoon (1964) - Bus Conductor
- The Wrong Box (1966) - Native Bearer
- The Whisperers (1967) - Doctor
- Follow That Camel (1967) - Riff at Abdul's Tent (uncredited)
- Star! (1968) - African Ambassador (uncredited)
- Hot Millions (1968) - Customs Man in Rio (uncredited)
- Carry On Again Doctor (1969) - Native Porter
- Baxter! (1973) - Dr. Barbour
- O Lucky Man! (1973)
- Pressure (1976) - Lucas
- Firepower (1979) - Manley Reckford
- An American Werewolf in London (1981) - Ted
- Biggles (1986) - Tribesman (final film role)
