= Leave Taking =

1987 play by Winsome Pinnock

- Original language: English
- Written by: Winsome Pinnock
- Characters: Enid Matthews; Del Matthews; Viv Matthews; Mai; Broderick
- Setting: London

Premiere
- Date: 11 November 1987
- Place: Liverpool Playhouse

Leave Taking is a play by Winsome Pinnock that was first produced by the Liverpool Playhouse in 1987. Pinnock's first full-length play, it won the 1991 George Devine Award and, in 1994, was produced by the National Theatre. It was the first play by a Black British woman to be produced by the National Theatre.

Leave Taking is a set text for the English Literature GCSE examined by AQA and Eduqas.

== Synopsis ==
Leave Taking focuses on a British-Jamaican mother, Enid, and her two teenage daughters, Del and Viv, who live in North London. Enid moved from Jamaica as part of the Windrush generation with the promise of a better life, but now works two jobs to support bringing up her daughters. She worries about them and seeks guidance from Mai, an Obeah woman to whom she goes for readings, and from Broderick, a family friend.

== Productions ==
Notable casts
Role	Liverpool Playhouse	Lyric Hammersmith	National Theatre	Bush Theatre
Role	1987	1990	1994	2018
Enid Matthews	Ellen Thomas	Ellen Thomas	Jenni George	Sarah Niles
Del Matthews	Natasha Williams	Marianne Jean-Baptiste	Karen Tomlin	Seraphina Beh
Viv Matthews	Lisa Lewis		Ginny Holder	Nicholle Cherie
Mai	Lucita Lijertwood		Doreen Ingleton	Adjoa Andoh
Broderick	Tommy Eytle	Allister Bain	David Webber	Wil Johnson

Leave Taking premiered at the Liverpool Playhouse on 11 November 1987, directed by Kate Rowland and running until 5 December. Philip Key, writing for the Liverpool Daily Post, said that the play was "a finely-hewn piece of writing" and "possess[ed] a universal appeal". Key named it as among the contenders for the Daily Post's Best New Play of 1987 alongside Self Portrait by Sheila Yeger, but they were beaten by Barnaby and the Old Boys by Keith Baxter.

The play was revived in 1990 at the Lyric, Hammersmith, directed by Hettie Macdonald, running between 26 July and 25 August.

After being included in Nicholas Wright's collection of 100 Best Plays, Leave Taking was picked to be produced by the National Theatre. Directed by Paulette Randall, the production premiered at the Gulbenkian Theatre at the University of Kent in Canterbury on 8 December 1994. It then transferred to the Cottesloe Theatre before a national tour which lasted until March 1995.

The play was revived at the Bush Theatre in 2018, directed by Madani Younis. Seraphina Beh and Nicholle Cherie starred as Del and Viv, Sarah Niles as Enid, Wil Johnson as Uncle Brod and Adjoa Andoh as Mai.
