= Corinne Skinner-Carter =

Trinidadian actress (born 1930)

- Born: Corinne Skinner; 2 March 1930 (age 96); Trinidad
- Occupation: Actress
- Spouse: Trevor Carter (m. 1955; died 2008)

Corinne Skinner-Carter (née Skinner; born 2 March 1930) is a Trinidadian actress based in the United Kingdom. As Corinne Skinner, she began acting professionally in the 1950s. She has worked in black British film and television, and is possibly best known for her role as Audrey Trueman in BBC's television soap opera EastEnders.

== Career ==
Born Corinne Skinner into a privileged Trinidadian family, she began her theatrical career almost immediately after school, dancing with the company of Geoffrey Holder (brother of dancer and artist Boscoe Holder). As she recalled: "My grandmother was very upset because I had to go on the stage and she said, 'nice girls do not go on the stage.'" She went to the UK in 1955 to train as a teacher. Soon after arriving there, she married her childhood sweetheart, the educationist Trevor Carter (1930–2008) at Christ Church, Hampstead, on New Year's Eve, 1955. While training, she supplemented her income by dancing and acting in film and television. She continued to perform while simultaneously working as a teacher for Islington London Borough Council in North London.

Her first acting role was a small part in the all-black cast of the play The Green Pastures, shown in the BBC Sunday Night Theatre in September 1958. She made an early uncredited appearance in the film Flame in the Streets in 1961, and throughout the 1960s she appeared as a dancer in Cleopatra (1963), A Funny Thing Happened on the Way to the Forum (1966) and Live and Let Die (1973). Other minor parts followed in TV shows such as Dixon of Dock Green, Play for Today, Coronation Street (1975) and Man About the House, until the late 1970s, when she was cast as Hortense Bennett in the television drama series Empire Road (BBC, 1978–79), her breakthrough role.

For the next 10 years, Skinner-Carter worked mainly on television, appearing in Jury (1983), South of the Border (BBC, 1988–90) and Happy Families (BBC, 1989–90). She also appeared in other television series, including The Gentle Touch (LWT, 1980–84) and Black Silk (BBC, 1985). Her film performances include in Horace Ové's Pressure (1975 — the first full-length drama feature film by a Black director in Britain), in Menelik Shabazz's Burning an Illusion (1981) and in the short film Dreaming Rivers (1988).

In the 1990s, Skinner-Carter appeared in mainstream shows such as Rides (BBC, 1991–93), A Touch of Frost, Lovejoy and Grange Hill. In 2000, she got her biggest role to date when she was cast in EastEnders for 32 episodes as Audrey Trueman. The role lasted until September 2001, when the character of Audrey was killed off. Following this, Skinner-Carter landed roles in Doctors, Casualty and The Bill.

Skinner-Carter has also been associated with the Notting Hill Carnival, judging for the event in 1997.

Her memoir, Why Not Me? From Trinidad to Albert Square Via Empire Road (written with Z. Nia Reynolds), was published in 2011.

In June 2016, Skinner-Carter performed one of the monologues shown on BBC Four in a series of eight 15-minute short stories entitled Snatches: Moments From 100 Years Of Women’s Lives, as part of a season marking the anniversary of women's suffrage in the UK.
