= The Chain (1984 film) =

1984 film by Jack Gold

- Directed by: Jack Gold
- Written by: Jack Rosenthal
- Produced by: Victor Glynn
- Starring: Maurice Denham, Nigel Hawthorne, Denis Lawson, Leo McKern, Warren Mitchell, Rita Wolf
- Cinematography: Wolfgang Suschitzky
- Edited by: Bill Blunden
- Music by: Stanley Myers
- Distributed by: Film Four International; Rank Organisation
- Release date: 1984
- Running time: 100 min
- Country: United Kingdom
- Language: English
- Budget: £1.15 million

The Chain is a 1984 British comedy drama film written by Jack Rosenthal and directed by Jack Gold. It stars Maurice Denham, Nigel Hawthorne, Denis Lawson, Warren Mitchell and Leo McKern. The film was produced and distributed by Film Four International. In 1994, a spin-off television series, Moving Story, was made for ITV in which Warren Clarke played the part of Bamber.

The theme tune is sung by Barbara Dickson. The opening dialogue is sampled on "V. Thirteen" by Big Audio Dynamite; "Good morning, Sodom and Gomorrah, Good morning, sinners, No, that wasn't your radio set on the blink again".

== Plot ==
The Chain tells the story of seven households which jointly constitutes a circular property chain and various removals employees who are tasked with assisting each household in its move. Through the moving process it follows the trials and tribulations, from trivial to profound, of each household and mover, who are each guilty of one of the seven deadly sins.

Bamber leads his team and lorry for Lasts Removal and Storage and their first job is in Willesden.

The story moves to the first link of the chain: Des in Hackney (representing Lust). He is leaving the room in his Mum's house and she has rented the room out but isn’t happy with him leaving. His friend Stan packs all his things into an old Mini Countryman. Des is moving in with his girlfriend. He is waiting outside his new home for his girlfriend and a policeman challenges him.

Keith (representing Sloth) in Tufnell Park has a self-drive van and is moving to Willesden as first time buyers with his Indian wife Carrie. He meets Des moving into his old rented flat and warns him of the landlord. En route to pick up the keys at the estate agent they argue about having kids.

Dudley and Alison in Willesden have a young daughter and need a bigger flat. They remember their daughter's conception. Paul from Lasts goes to the wrong flat and thoroughly confuses an old lady. Bamber is moving them to Hammersmith. Their military style granddad is trying to organise the move. Granddad (representing Envy) is moving into the granny flat in the new property. However, some punks have squatted in his new home and changed the lock.

In Hammersmith the Mr Thorn (Avarice) insists that the removal men take all door-knobs, light bulbs and ashes from the fireplaces (for the roses). His wife does not appreciate his meanness. They are going to 55 Christchurch Hill in Hampstead. Mr Thorn returns to his old house while Bamber and the Metcalfs are moving in: he is looking for some elastic bands he forgot.

Two basic problems break the chain: the person in Hampstead decides she is not leaving, resulting in the Thorns being homeless, but they have also been conned into losing all their possessions due to passing them to a bogus removal firm, who had submitted the lowest price.

Bamber persuades the owner, widow Mrs Andreos (Billie Whitelaw), to make her planned move to Holland Park by sitting in her kitchen and letting her tell stories of her late husband and her native Limassol. Not only does Bamber persuade her he also gets an extra job - cash in hand. Mrs Andreos takes a lift in the removal van and starts a singalong of Karma Chameleon. Although Mrs Andreos represents Gluttony, this links to her late husband who was a "glutton for punishment".

The family in Holland Park (representing Pride) are moving to Knightsbridge. Deirdre is jealous that their neighbour is moving to Belgrave Square in Belgravia. Deirdre has bought a new Daimler, presumably to arrive in style, but has it clamped as she had failed to transfer the parking permit. They are moving because Holland Park is becoming "too shabby".

In Knightsbridge Thomas (representing Wrath) discusses his decisions with his friend, telling him to auction his belongings at Sotheby's - he is dying. He keeps only one item: a cheap souvenir plate from Southend-on-Sea which presumably has sentimental value. He asks the chauffeur of his Rolls-Royce to take him to the house where he was brought up, in Quilter Street in Whitechapel, where he is renting the room vacated by Desmond, the first character we see leaving home at the start of the film.

The story ends showing each in their new home then an old homeless lady wrapping herself in newspaper preparing to spend the night in a doorway. She has threaded through the story.

== Cast ==
- Herbert Norville as Des
- Carmen Munroe as Des's Mum
- Ron Pember as Stan
- Denis Lawson as Keith
- Rita Wolf as Carrie
- Phyllis Logan as Alison Metcalf
- David Troughton as Dudley Metcalf
- Maurice Denham as Grandpa
- Nigel Hawthorne as Mr. Thorn
- Anna Massey as Betty Thorn
- Billie Whitelaw as Mrs. Andreos
- Judy Parfitt as Deirdre
- John Rowe as Alex
- Matthew Blakstad as Mark
- Charlotte Long as Rosemary
- Leo McKern as Thomas
- Warren Mitchell as Bamber - removal man
- Bernard Hill as Nick - removal man
- Tony Westrope as Paul - removal man
- Gary Waldhorn as Tornado - removal man
- Mark Dignam as Ambrose
- Jade Magri as Tasha
- Vicky Licorish as Myra

== Production ==
The film was originally written for television. Filming started 6 August 1984. Part of the finance came from the Rank Organisation.

== Reception ==
The Guardian wrote "it is a pleasure to find a British comedy that is rooted in local observation without succumbing to parochialism."

The Evening Standard said the film "is more than a joy to watch - it's a duty."
