= The Boys and Mrs B =

1977 British TV comedy special

- Screenplay by: Ronald Chesney, Ronald Wolfe
- Directed by: Dennis Main Wilson
- Starring: Thora Hird; Tony Robinson; Sue Upton; Richard Caldicot; Gorden Kaye
- Music by: Ronnie Hazlehurst
- Country of origin: United Kingdom
- Original language: English

Production
- Producer: Dennis Main Wilson
- Running time: 30 min
- Production company: BBC

Original release
- Release: April 26, 1977

The Boys and Mrs B is a 1977 British comedy television special. Written by Ronald Chesney and Ronald Wolfe, it was originally intended as pilot for a sitcom but was made as a one-off special. It was produced and directed by Dennis Main Wilson with a cast of established and upcoming comedy actors.

== Plot ==
Mrs. Battley runs a youth center for the local authority but has trouble controlling the boys, who have hired a stripper to appear at a fundraising event.

== Production and broadcast ==
Ronald Chesney and Ronald Wolfe, creators of successful comedy series such as The Rag Trade and On The Buses, pitched the idea of a sitcom set in a youth club to Dennis Main Wilson in 1976. The aim was a series that would appeal to a teenage and young adult audience, and be a vehicle for young comedy actors. A pilot was commissioned, however only days before it was to be recorded the BBC decided not to proceed with a series. With only very minor changes to the script it was made as a one off television special.

The special was recorded in February 1977 and the original broadcast was on 26 April at 7.40pm on BBC One in London.

== Cast ==
- Thora Hird as Mrs. Battley
- Tony Robinson as Mark
- Herbert Norville as Nick
- Sue Upton as Jackie
- Richard Caldicot as Councillor Cooper
- Gorden Kaye as Mr. Hobkirk
- Luan Peters as Ingrid
