= Empire Road =

British television series

- Genre: Drama
- Written by: Michael Abbensetts
- Directed by: Alex Marshall
- Starring: Norman Beaton; Allister Bain; Sheila Kelley; Frances Cox; Meg Johnson; Thomas Baptiste; Wayne Laryea; Rosa Roberts
- Country of origin: United Kingdom
- Original language: English
- No. of series: 2
- No. of episodes: 15

Production
- Running time: 30 minutes

Original release
- Network: BBC2
- Release: 31 October 1978 – 1 November 1979

Empire Road is a British television series, made by the BBC in 1978 and 1979. Written by Michael Abbensetts, the programme ran for two series.

The series was the first British television series to be written, acted and directed predominantly by black artists. A soap opera, similar in format to Coronation Street, Empire Road depicted life for the African-Caribbean, East Indian and South Asian residents of a racially diverse street in the city of Birmingham.

Cast members included Norman Beaton (Everton Bennett), Corinne Skinner-Carter (Hortense Bennett), Wayne Laryea, Joseph Marcell, Rudolph Walker and Rosa Roberts. The programme also provided early TV exposure for Julie Walters, who appeared in a few episodes. The series was made at BBC Pebble Mill with location work in the Handsworth area of Birmingham.

The eponymously named theme song was recorded by the band Matumbi and also released as a single in 1978.

The general premise of the series concerns the day-to-day life of a residential property landlord (Norman Beaton) who also owns a minimarket – where his brother-in-law is a junior partner – and sometimes deals with social concerns of the time, namely race issues, family issues and mixed relationships. Problems that arise are usually solved or at least calmed by the protagonist family's patriarch using reasoning based on his life experience, wisdom and common sense. Some of the younger characters affectionately regard him as a benign "godfather" figure. The patriarch's son runs a dry-cleaning business.

Norman Beaton later went on to star in the Channel 4 comedy series Desmond's.
