= The Orchid House (novel) =

1953 novel by Phyllis Shand Allfrey

- Author: Phyllis Shand Allfrey
- Genre: Fiction, Literary Fiction
- Publisher: Constable & Co.
- Publication date: January 1, 1953
- Pages: 223 pages

The Orchid House is a book published in 1953 and the only novel written by Dominican writer Phyllis Shand Allfrey. It is considered "a pioneering work of Caribbean literature". The Orchid House is a fictionalized account of Allfrey's early life, narrated by an old Black nurse Lally from Montserrat. It was turned into a highly acclaimed film for British television.

Originally published by Constable & Co., it was reissued in 1982 by Virago Press, and reprinted in 1991 at the time its Channel 4 television adaptation of the same name came out (directed by Horace Ové with Casting Director John Hubbard and starring Elizabeth Hurley, Madge Sinclair, Diana Quick, Kate Buffery, Lennox Honychurch, British painter and grand-niece of Phyllis Shand Allfrey, Lindy Allfrey and Frances Barber. An American edition of the novel appeared in 1996.

A French-language version, La Maison des Orchidées, appeared in 1954.

== Summary ==
Summarized in an Introduction by Lizabeth Paravisini-Gebert, "The novel, as narrated by the old nurse Lally, revolves around the return of three Creole sisters to their native island after years abroad: Stella, drawn to the lush tropical by an impassioned yearning; Joan, a grass-roots political activist in London; and Natalie, a wealthy old man's hedonistic widow..."

== Reprints ==
- The Orchid House. Virago Press. 1991. ISBN 1-85381-338-9.
- The Orchid House. Rutgers University Press. 1992. ISBN 0-8135-2332-X.

== See also ==
- The Orchid House, the television miniseries.
- Wide Sargasso Sea by Jean Rhys
