= The Orchid House (TV serial) =

1991 UK television miniseries

The Orchid House is a four-part television serial that first aired on British television's Channel 4 from 21 February to 14 March 1991, directed by Horace Ové and produced by Malcolm Craddock. Its cast featured Diana Quick, Madge Sinclair, Nigel Terry, Elizabeth Hurley, Kate Buffery and Frances Barber, and was based on Phyllis Shand Allfrey's only novel of the same name (first published in 1953).

The film was shot in its entirety in Allfrey's homeland, the island of Dominica, over a period of 10 weeks.

Onyekachi Wambu writes about The Orchid House: "Its focus on the declining power of the white plantocracy on the island of Dominica between the war years, handled through the prism of an intimate family drama, has great depth while remaining accessible."
