= Pressure (1976 film) =

1976 British drama film by Horace Ové

- Original theatrical poster
- Directed by: Horace Ové
- Written by: Horace Ové; Samuel Selvon
- Produced by: Robert Buckler
- Starring: Herbert Norville; Oscar James; Frank Singuineau; David Kinoshi
- Cinematography: Mike Davis
- Edited by: Alan J. Cumner-Price
- Production company: BFI Production
- Distributed by: Crawford Films, Ltd.
- Release dates: 19 October 1976 (TIFF); November 1976 (United States)
- Running time: 136 minutes
- Country: United Kingdom
- Language: English

Pressure is a 1976 British drama film directed by Horace Ové and starring Herbert Norville, Oscar James and Frank Singuineau. Co-written by Ové with Samuel Selvon, it is hailed as the UK's first Black dramatic feature-length film, and has been characterised as "a gritty and dynamic study of a generation in crisis". Ové said in a 2005 interview: "What Pressure tried to do was to portray the experience of the Windrush generation, the kids who came with them and the kids born here."

== Plot ==
Tony is a second-generation Black British teenager, born and raised in Britain. The rest of his family—his mother, father, and older brother—were born in Trinidad in the Caribbean. This affects the family members' viewpoints about the society they live in. Tony's mother says that they, as black people, must work hard, mind their own business and respect White people's laws because the whites have the power.

The film shows how the older generations are satisfied with living in a society ruled by the white English, which differs from the views of the younger generation. There is a disconnection between the way Tony feels about Britain and the way that his family feels, specifically his brother. Tony's brother is active in the black Power movement and is constantly discussing how black people are treated as second-class citizens, and have to deal with systematic racism. He stresses the idea of a collective effort on behalf of black people, as they encompass their culture and consciousness and they must spread this consciousness.

Tony's brother emphasises how black people must organise politically to deal with the situation themselves, given that the government is not on their side. Tony tries to assimilate into the white-dominated society that surrounds him, as well as to fit in with his own family and their traditions. However, even as Tony tries to assimilate and maintain his faith in a British society where he can progress, he is continuously faced with obstacles.

Tony goes dancing with a white friend and then goes back with her to her apartment. A white adult screams that if he does not leave she will call the police, and that the White girl should feel ashamed for bringing back a black boy. When Tony attends one of his brother's meetings, he witnesses the mistreatment of black people firsthand. Police forcefully enter the meeting with no warrant or reason, and beat up and arrest the black activists. Police then tear apart Tony's family's home, in search of non-existent drugs.

In addition to this, throughout the film, Tony cannot find a job that matches his educational qualifications. Events such as this bring to light the forces of oppression, and lead to Tony's disillusionment with an unjust English society. Tony also struggles with his identity as a black child born in England to West Indian parents. He has difficulty relating to his brother who was not born in Europe, while he also cannot relate to his white friends, who do not share his obstacles in England. Tony's brother feels that all whites are evil. Tony comes to his own conclusions based on his experiences, declaring that since only a handful of white people hold all the power, many white people are in the same position as black people, but just do not realise it.

== Cast ==
- Herbert Norville as Anthony "Tony" Watson
- Oscar James as Colin
- Frank Singuineau as Lucas
- Lucita Lijertwood as Bopsie
- Sheila Scott-Wilkinson as Sister Louise
- Ed Devereaux as Police Inspector
- T-Bone Wilson as Junior
- Ram John Holder as Brother John
- Norman Beaton as Preacher
- John Landry as Mr Crapson
- Philip Jackson as C.I.D. Officer
- Corinne Skinner-Carter as Tony's Aunt

== Release ==
The film was shelved for almost three years by its funders, the British Film Institute (BFI), ostensibly because it contained scenes showing police brutality.

=== Critical reception ===
After its release in 1975, Pressure was well received critically. According to Julia Toppin,

Pressure is a product of its time, but the issues and themes it explores remain relevant to the black experience in Britain today, including the cycle of educational deprivation, poverty, unemployment and antisocial behaviour. The depiction of police harassment and the controversial 'sus' (suspicion) laws is echoed by the similar, and equally controversial, 'Stop and Search' policy of today. The film also explores media under-reporting and misrepresenting of black issues and protests. ...Pressure remains a key Black British film, which helps to demonstrate how modern multi-cultural Britain was shaped.

Ové said in a December 1987 interview for Monthly Film Bulletin: "When things happen here, like Broadwater Farm or the Brixton riots, I get very annoyed with the media coverage. It is so superficial. They don't do proper research. That is why I made Pressure (1978). I was tired of reading in the papers about young blacks hanging around on street corners, mugging old ladies. Nobody tried to find out why they were doing it."

With Pressure, Ové became the first black British filmmaker to direct a feature film. In 2017, The Telegraph ranked Pressure as the 42nd-greatest British film of all time. It also topped The Guardian's list of 10 pioneering films reflecting black life in Britain over the last 40 years.

=== Realism and Cinematic Strategy in Pressure ===
Horace Ové’s Pressure stands out for its deliberate blending of realism with constructed cinematic techniques, creating a film that is both authentic and symbolically charged. As James S. Williams discusses, Ové employed unconventional methods to heighten the film’s emotional impact and reinforce its social commentary. The police raid scene, for instance, was filmed with actors unaware of when or how the raid would occur, ensuring that their responses would be genuine and deeply rooted in fear and confusion. This technique blurred the line between acting and lived experience, reinforcing the oppressive atmosphere that the film sought to depict.

Another powerful example is the church scene featuring actor Norman Beaton as a preacher delivering a sermon that incorporates shockingly racist rhetoric about cleansing oneself of “blackness.” This was filmed during an actual church service with a Black congregation, heightening the emotional stakes and forcing both the characters and the audience to confront internalized and systemic racism head-on.

The film’s commitment to realism extends to its visual style as well. The opening sequence juxtaposes faded, nostalgic photographs of the Caribbean with stark black-and-white illustrations of the harsh realities faced by Windrush immigrants upon arriving in Britain. This visual contrast sets a tone of disillusionment that resonates throughout the film.

=== 2023 re-release ===
Pressure was re-released in a restored version in 2023, with a joint restoration World Premiere taking place on 11 October at the BFI London Film Festival and at the New York Film Festival. It also featured the following month in a retrospective at the BFI Southbank of the work of Horace Ové (who died in September 2023), when Peter Bradshaw wrote in The Guardian about Pressure: "It has the punchy quality of a 21st-century graphic novel, eagerly tackling Black Power and social realism, mixing comedy, tragedy and irony....The film's reappearance may be a madeleine for the 70s, but it's also a reminder that the pressure Britain's black communities have withstood hasn't subsided."
