= Phyllis Shand Allfrey =

West Indian writer and politician

- Born: Phyllis Byam Shand; 24 October 1908; Roseau, Dominica, West Indies
- Died: 4 February 1986 (aged 77); Dominica
- Occupations: Writer, socialist activist, newspaper editor and politician
- Notable work: The Orchid House (1953)

Phyllis Byam Shand Allfrey (24 October 1908 – 4 February 1986) was a West Indian writer, socialist activist, newspaper editor and politician of the island of Dominica in the Caribbean. She is best known for her first novel, The Orchid House (1953), based on her early life. In 1991, it was adapted into a Channel 4 television miniseries of the same name in the United Kingdom, directed by Horace Ové.

== Early life and family background ==
Phyllis Byam Shand Allfrey was born in 1908 in Roseau, Dominica, West Indies, the daughter of Francis Byam Berkeley Shand and Elfreda (daughter of Henry Alfred Alford Nicholls), and was baptized Phyllis Byam. She was the second of her parents' four daughters. Her father's settler family was long established in Roseau, where Phyllis and her sisters were raised. With roots in the West Indies going back to the 17th century, Phyllis later described herself as "a West Indian of over 300 years' standing, despite my pale face".

Her earliest ancestor in the West Indies was Lieutenant General William Byam, a Royalist officer who in 1644 defended Bridgwater in Somerset against a parliamentary force. Imprisoned in the Tower of London, he was permitted to migrate to the West Indies. After the Restoration of King Charles II in 1660, he was granted estates in Antigua.

== Life and career ==
In 1930, Phyllis Shand married Robert Edward Allfrey, an English engineer from Oxford, and they had five children, including their adopted sons Robbie and David from a Carib reservation. Their daughter Phina, another Oxford University graduate, was killed in a motor accident in Botswana.

Living in London in the 1930s, Allfrey began to write poetry, and her collection entitled In Circles, comprising 13 poems written between 1936 and 1939, was published in 1940. In 1941, Allfrey established a connection with Tribune, the newspaper of the left wing of the British Labour Party, where, from 1941 to 1944, her reviews, poems and short stories appeared regularly alongside those of contributors such as Naomi Mitchison, Stevie Smith, Julian Symons, Elizabeth Taylor, Inez Holden, and George Orwell, the latter becoming its literary editor in 1943. Phyllis Shand earned second place in an international poetry competition judged by Vita Sackville-West. Allfrey's second collection of poems, Palm and Oak, was published in 1950. Her novel The Orchid House was published in 1953, and the following year the Allfreys returned to Dominica.

In politics, Allfrey co-founded the Dominica Labour Party in 1955. On the formation of the West Indies Federation, this was affiliated to the West Indies Federal Labour Party, and in 1958 she was elected to the new Federal Parliament of the West Indies Federation, representing Dominica. Within weeks, she was serving in the government of Sir Grantley Adams as Minister of Labour and Social Affairs, becoming the only woman minister of the new Federation.

She edited the Dominica Herald and also published and wrote for another newspaper, The Dominica Star, which operated from 1965 and 1982. In 1968, she was one of the founders of Dominica Freedom Party.

== Death ==
Allfrey died in Dominica in 1986, aged 77. A posthumous collection of her short stories, It Falls Into Place, was published by Papillote Press in 2004. She left behind an unpublished novel, In the Cabinet. A collection of her poems, Love for an Island: The Collected Poems of Phyllis Shand Allfrey, was published in 2014 by Papillote Press.

== Publications ==
- In Circles (poems, 1940)
- Palm and Oak (poems, 1950)
- The Orchid House (1953, Constable); new edition Virago, 1982, ISBN 978-0-8135-2332-3
- It Falls into Place (2004), Papillote Press, ISBN 978-0-9532-2241-4
- Love for an Island: The Collected Poems of Phyllis Shand Allfrey (2014; edited by Lizabeth Paravisini-Gebert), Papillote Press, ISBN 978-0-9571-1875-1

== See also ==
- Jean Rhys
