= Winsome Pinnock =

British playwright (born 1961)

Winsome Pinnock FRSL
- Born: 1961 (age 64–65); Islington, London, England
- Education: Goldsmiths, University of London (BA, PhD); Birkbeck, University of London (MA)
- Occupation: Playwright
- Writing career
- Language: English
- Notable works: Leave Taking; Talking in Tongues; Mules; Rockets and Blue Lights
- Notable awards: George Devine Award; Alfred Fagon Award; Windham-Campbell Literature Prize

Winsome Pinnock FRSL (born 1961) is a British playwright who is "probably Britain's most well known black female playwright". She was described in The Guardian as "the godmother of black British playwrights".

== Life ==
Winsome Pinnock was born in Islington, North London, to parents who were both migrants from Smithville, Jamaica. Her mother was a cleaner, and her father a checker at Smithfield Meat Market. Pinnock attended Elizabeth Garrett Anderson Comprehensive Girls' School (formerly Starcross School) in Islington, and graduated from Goldsmiths, University of London (1979–82) with a BA (Joint Honours) degree in English and Drama, and in 1983 from Birkbeck, University of London, with an MA degree in Modern Literature in English. In 2025, she submitted her PhD thesis to Goldsmiths.

Pinnock's award-winning plays include The Winds of Change (Half Moon Theatre, 1987), Leave Taking (Liverpool Playhouse Studio, 1987; Lyric Theatre (Hammersmith), 1990; National Theatre, 1995), Picture Palace (commissioned by the Women's Theatre Group, 1988), A Hero's Welcome (Women's Playhouse Trust at the Royal Court Theatre Upstairs, 1989), A Rock in Water (Royal Court Young People's Theatre at the Theatre Upstairs, 1989; inspired by the life of Claudia Jones), Talking in Tongues (Royal Court Theatre Upstairs, 1991), Mules (Clean Break, 1996) and One Under (Tricycle Theatre, 2005). She also adapted Jean Rhys' short story "Let Them Call It Jazz" for BBC Radio 4 in 1998, and has written screenplays and television episodes. Pinnock's work is included in the 2019 anthology New Daughters of Africa, edited by Margaret Busby.

Pinnock has been Visiting Lecturer at Royal Holloway College, University of London, and Senior Visiting Fellow at the University of Cambridge. She lectures at Kingston University, London. In 2020, she was elected as a Fellow of the Royal Society of Literature (FRSL).

In 2022, Pinnock was the recipient of a Windham-Campbell Literature Prize for drama.

In 2025, Pinnock was appointed Professor of Professional Practice at the Royal Central School of Speech & Drama, a title shared by director Katie Mitchell and playwright Mark Ravenhill.

== Awards ==
- 1991: George Devine Award
- Unity Theatre Trust Award
- Pearson Plays on Stage Award For Best Play of the Year
- 2018: Alfred Fagon Award
- 2020: Fellow of the Royal Society of Literature
- 2022: Windham-Campbell Literature Prize (drama)

== Selected works ==
- The Winds Of Change, Half Moon Theatre, London, 1987.
- Leave Taking, Playhouse, Liverpool, 1987, and National Theatre, London, 1988. Lyric Theatre (Hammersmith), 1990; Bush Theatre, May 2018.
- Picture Palace, Women's Theatre Group, London, 1988.
- A Rock In Water, Royal Court Young People's Theatre at the Theatre Upstairs, Royal Court Theatre, London, 1989. Published in Black Plays: 2, ed. Yvonne Brewster, London: Methuen Drama, 1989.
- A Hero's Welcome, Women's Playhouse Trust at the Theatre Upstairs, Royal Court Theatre, London, 1989.
- Talking In Tongues, Royal Court Theatre Upstairs, London, 1991. Published in The Methuen Drama Book of Plays by Black British Writers, Bloomsbury Methuen Drama, 2011, ISBN 978-1408131244
- Mules, Clean Break, Royal Court Theatre, London, 1996
- Can You Keep a Secret?, Cottesloe Theatre, National Theatre, London, 1999
- Water, Tricycle Theatre, London, 2000.
- One Under, Tricycle Theatre, London, 2005.
- IDP, Tricycle Theatre, London, 2006
- Taken, Soho Theatre, London, 2010.
- Her Father's Daughter, BBC Radio 4.
- The Dinner Party, BBC Radio 4.
- Lazarus, BBC Radio 3, 2013.
- The Principles of Cartography, Bush Theatre, 2017.
- Rockets and Blue Lights, 2018
- The Authenticator, Royal National Theatre, 2026.
- Tituba, Court Theatre, 2026

== Sources ==
- Griffin, Gabriele (2006). "The Remains of the British Empire: The Plays of Winsome Pinnock". In Luckhurst, Mary (ed.). A Companion to Modern British and Irish Drama. ISBN 978-1-4051-2228-3.
- "Bibliography: Winsome Pinnock", Contemporary Theatre and Drama in English
- IDP - A play by Winsome Pinnock
- Winsome Pinnock at Black Plays Archive, National Theatre.
