= Horace Ové =

British photographer and filmmaker (1936–2023)

Sir Horace Ové CBE
- Born: Horace Courtenay Jones; 3 December 1936; Belmont, Trinidad and Tobago
- Died: 16 September 2023 (aged 86); London, England
- Occupations: Director; producer; photographer
- Known for: First black British filmmaker to direct a feature-length film
- Notable work: Pressure (1976)
- Children: 5, including Indra and Zak
- Family: Stefan Kalipha (cousin)
- Awards: Knight Bachelor (2022)
- Website: www.horaceove.com

Sir Horace Shango Ové CBE (born Horace Courtenay Jones; 3 December 1936 (Note: Obituaries of Ové state that he died at the age of 86, although his year of birth has often been given as 1939, rather than 1936.) – 16 September 2023) was a Trinidadian-born British filmmaker, photographer, painter and writer based in London, England. One of the leading black independent filmmakers to emerge in Britain in the post-war period, Ové was the first black British filmmaker to direct a feature-length film, Pressure (1976). In its retrospective documentary 100 Years of Cinema, the British Film Institute (BFI) declared: "Horace Ové is undoubtedly a pioneer in Black British history and his work provides a perspective on the Black experience in Britain."

Ové built a prolific and sometimes controversial career as a filmmaker, documenting racism and the Black Power movement in Britain over many decades through photography and in films such as Baldwin's Nigger (1969), Pressure, and Dream to Change the World (2003). Ové's documentaries, including Reggae (1971) and Skateboard Kings (1978), have also become models for emerging filmmakers. He was awarded a knighthood in the 2022 New Year Honours for services to media.

== Early years ==
Horace Ové was born Horace Courtenay Jones on 3 December 1936 in Belmont, Trinidad and Tobago, where he grew up as part of a large and "somewhat bohemian family – a mixture of African, Indian, French and Spanish". As Attilah Springer has noted, he "was born into the Jones clan.... The Jones name was not theirs originally, but Ové's grandfather changed it when he wanted to open a business in downtown Port of Spain; Indian-sounding places of business were not acceptable at that time in colonial Trinidad."

In 1960, after legally changing his name to Horace Ové, he moved to Britain to study painting, photography and interior design. He also lived for a while in Rome, Italy, as a painter. His entry into the film world was through working as a film extra on the set of the 1963 Joseph L. Mankiewicz epic historical drama Cleopatra, starring Elizabeth Taylor, after its production moved to Rome.

Ové returned to London, where he lived during his early years in Brixton, West Hampstead and Camden Town, marrying Irish immigrant Mary Irvine, and studying at the London School of Film Technique.

== As film director ==
In 1966, Ové directed The Art of the Needle, a short film for the Acupuncture Association. In 1969, he made another short film, titled Baldwin's Nigger, in which African-American writer James Baldwin – in conjunction with civil rights activist and comedian Dick Gregory – discusses Black experience and identity in Britain and the US. Filmed at the West Indian Students' Centre in London, the film documents a February 1968 lecture delivered there by Baldwin and a question-and-answer session with the audience.

Ové's next film, shot at a concert in Wembley Arena in 1970, was a documentary called Reggae, which was successful in cinemas and was shown on BBC television. Ové subsequently made other documentaries for the BBC, including King Carnival (1973, in The World About Us series), which has been acclaimed as "one of the best ever made about the history of Trinidad and Tobago Carnival". Then, in 1976, he directed the film for which he is best-known, Pressure – the first full-length drama feature film by a Black director in Britain, which he co-wrote with Samuel Selvon. Telling the story of a London teenager who joins the Black Power movement in the 1970s, Pressure featured scenes of police brutality that ostensibly led to its banning for nearly three years by its own backers, the British Film Institute, before it was eventually released to wide acclaim.

Ové's other television work included directing A Hole in Babylon (co-written with Jim Hawkins, based on the Spaghetti House siege, featuring a cast including T-Bone Wilson, Trevor Thomas and Archie Pool), made for the BBC's Play for Today series, and first transmitted on 29 November 1979; four episodes of the pioneering series Empire Road in 1979, an episode of The Professionals ("A Man Called Quinn", 1981) and The Equalizer (shown on 8 January 1996 in the BBC series Hidden Empire), about the 1919 Amritsar Massacre, which won two Indian Academy Awards in 1996.

Ové co-wrote with H. O. Nazareth the script of the television film The Garland (1981), which led to the creation of an independent production company named Penumbra. Alongside Ové and Nazareth, other members of Penumbra Productions included Michael Abbensetts, Lindsay Barrett, Margaret Busby, Farrukh Dhondy, and Mustapha Matura.

Ové's film Playing Away (1987, with a screenplay by Caryl Phillips), starring Norman Beaton and other actors such as Joseph Marcell, Ram John Holder, Brian Bovell, and Stefan Kalipha (incidentally, Ové's cousin), centres on the residents of the fictional British village of Sneddington, who invite the "Caribbean Brixton Conquistadors" (from South London) for a cricket match to commemorate "African Famine Week".

Ové's 2003 film Dream to Change the World (edited by Pete Stern) was a documentary about the life and work of John La Rose (1927–2006), the Trinidad-born activist, publisher and writer, who was the founder of New Beacon Books in London.

== As photographer ==
In parallel to his career in films is Ové's photography, which has been variously exhibited internationally over the decades, including at UCLA, the British Film Institute and the University of Tübingen, Germany. In 1984, he had the first solo exhibition by a Black photographer at The Photographers' Gallery, entitled Breaking Loose: Horace Ove, a retrospective that examines "his early photojournalism and the emergence of a strongly identifiable black culture in a post-colonial Britain" as well as documenting his travels throughout Europe, Africa and the Caribbean. Following this was another exhibition that focused on his images of Trinidad Carnival, Farewell to the Flesh, at Cornerhouse in Manchester, from 28 February to 5 April 1987.

In 2001, he was invited to exhibit his works in Recontres de la Photographie in Bamako, Mali.

In 2004, the exhibition Pressure: Photographs by Horace Ové, described as "the first in-depth look at his photographic back catalogue", curated by Jim Waters and David A. Bailey, in association with Autograph ABP, toured Britain, starting at Nottingham Castle museum, moving to the University of Brighton Gallery, the Norwich Gallery, Aberystwyth Arts Centre in Wales and the Arts Depot in London. A 34-page publication by the curators contained an extract from an interview with Ové by Michael McMillian. According to a description of that exhibition:

1960's Britain was a hotbed of political and creative activity, writers and thinkers came from around the world to discuss civil rights issues and form new movements. Horace Ové was at many of the meetings and captured the events as they unfolded, including the first Black Power meeting with Stokely Carmichael, Allen Ginsberg and Michael X, founder of the black power movement in the UK with John Lennon and Yoko Ono. He also photographed figures of the period including C. L. R. James, James Baldwin and Darcus Howe as well as Sam Selvon, Andrew Salkey and John La Rose the founding members of the Caribbean Artists' Movement. Ové also recorded the birth of the Notting Hill Carnival and charted its growth through the 1970s and 1980s from the early beginnings with the first Windrush generation to the pumping sound systems, fashions and street dancing of the younger generation. He has also recently brought his work up to date with new portraits of people like Sir Trevor MacDonald and Professor Stuart Hall.

Ové had an exhibition at the National Portrait Gallery, London, in 2005, as well as work exhibited at London's Victoria and Albert Museum, Tate Liverpool, the Whitechapel Gallery and a retrospective of his film and photographic work at the Barbican. His work also featured in the Tate Britain exhibition How We Are: Photographing Britain.

Interviewed in 2010 by The Guardian about his iconic 1967 photograph of Michael X with bodyguards at Paddington Station, Ové said: "I'm a film-maker as well as a photographer, and I live in a visual world. I've always been an active photographer – if there's anything going on socially or politically, I want to know about it. So the late 1960s and early 70s were a very busy time for me."

Ové also photographed artist Chris Ofili in Trinidad, and portraits of other Black creatives featured on his website include Linton Kwesi Johnson, Derek Walcott, Margaret Busby, Caryl Phillips, Ram John Holder, James Earl Jones, Rudolph Walker, Madge Sinclair, Melvin Van Peebles, John Akomfrah, Isaac Julien and Jimmy Cliff.

Ové's work was included in the 2025 exhibition Photography and the Black Arts Movement, 1955–1985 at the National Gallery of Art.

== As theatre director ==
During the course of his career, Ové also directed stage plays, including in 1973 Blackblast written by Lindsay Barrett, the first Black play to be shown at London's Institute of Contemporary Arts, The Swamp Dwellers by Wole Soyinka, and in 1993 The Lion by Michael Abbensetts, for Talawa Theatre Company at the Cochrane Theatre (30 September–23 October; also on British Council tour to Jamaica, performed at the Ward Theatre, Kingston, 3–13 November), starring Madge Sinclair, Stefan Kalipha and Danny Sapani.

== Directing style ==
In terms of style as a director, Ové admitted to being heavily influenced by neo-realism, having studied European filmmakers such as De Sica, Antonioni, Buñuel and Fellini during his time living in Rome. He acknowledged influences from African-American political leaders of the 1960s and 1970s such as Malcolm X and Stokely Carmichael but was somewhat disparaging of contemporary Black politics in Britain: "In black British politics there are still lot of things that are missing, that are not said."

== Personal life and death ==
Ové's first wife was Mary Irvine, with whom he had two children, actress Indra Ové and artist Zak Ové. Ové's subsequent marriage to Annabelle Alcazar, with whom he also had two children, filmmaker Kaz Ové and Make up Artist Ezana Ové (was one of the producers of Pressure and of later films, including 2007's The Ghost of Hing King Estate), ended in separation after 25 years.

Ové died in London on 16 September 2023, after suffering with Dementia and Alzheimer's for some years. He was 86. The BFI, which had scheduled a retrospective titled Power to the People: Horace Ové's Radical Vision, said in tribute to his career that spanned four decades and encompassed "cutting-edge drama and documentary" that he "worked outside of the system, showing generations of black film-makers that it could be done, and that their voices have power."

== Awards, honours and recognition ==
Ové was the recipient of the Scarlet Ibis medal from the Government of Trinidad and Tobago in recognition of his international achievements in television and film, and in 1986 was named Best Director for Independent Film and Television by the British Film Institute, awarded for his "contribution to British culture".

In 2006, he was one of five winners of the £30,000 Paul Hamlyn Foundation Award for Visual Arts.

Ové was appointed Commander of the Order of the British Empire (CBE) in the 2007 Birthday Honours for his contributions to the film industry in the UK.

In November 2011, three young filmmakers competing on Dragons' Den as part of the 55th BFI London Film Festival Education Events, First Light, won £2000 funding and professional mentoring having successfully pitched their idea to make a short documentary about Horace Ové.

At the 2012 Trinidad and Tobago Film Festival, Ové was honoured as a "T&T Film Pioneer".

In 2013, the government of Trinidad and Tobago recognized him as a National Icon, one of "60 nationals and organizations who have personified and epitomised the strong values, fundamental beliefs, and cultural aspirations of our society".

In 2017, at the 12th Screen Nation Film and Television Awards, Ové was honoured with the Edric Connor Trailblazer award.

Ové was awarded the British Independent Film Awards (BIFA) Special Jury Prize 2018, with the citation stating: "In a year where Windrush has been plastered across newspaper headlines, it seems fitting that the jury have chosen to honour one of the generation's proudest voices."

Ové was knighted in the 2022 New Year Honours for services to media. Also in 2022, The Film and Television Charity launched a fund named in his honour, the Sir Horace Ové Grant, aiming "to help Black and Global Majority people working behind the scenes in film, TV, and cinema to access opportunity and navigate barriers to career progression".

== Influence and legacy ==
The 2019 Somerset House exhibition Get Up, Stand Up Now, curated by Zak Ové, celebrated 50 years of Black creativity in Britain and beyond, beginning with "Horace Ové and his dynamic circle of Windrush generation creative peers, and extending to today's brilliant young Black talent globally".

A retrospective season titled Power to the People: Horace Ové's Radical Vision was announced for autumn 2023 as a celebration of his work at the BFI Southbank, featuring a restored version of Pressure to be premiered at the London Film Festival and the New York Film Festival, preceding the film's UK-wide cinema release.

== Selected filmography ==
- 1966 – The Art of the Needle (documentary; director)
- 1969 – Baldwin's Nigger (documentary of a lecture by James Baldwin, accompanied by Dick Gregory; director/producer)
- 1971 – Reggae (documentary, BBC; director)
- 1972 – Coleherne Jazz and Keskidee Blues (documentary, BBC; director)
- 1972 – The Black Safari (documentary, BBC Two, The World About Us; presenter)
- 1973 – King Carnival (documentary, BBC; director)
- 1973 – The Mangrove Nine (producer; directed by Franco Rosso, scripted by John La Rose)
- 1976 – Pressure (feature film; director, screenwriter with Sam Selvon)
- 1978 – Skateboard Kings (documentary, BBC; director)
- 1979 – Empire Road (TV series; episodes 5, 6 and 10)
- 1979 – A Hole in Babylon (BBC, Play for Today; director)
- 1980 – Stretch Hunter (drama; director, writer)
- 1980 – The Latchkey Children (serial, ITV, 6 episodes; director)
- 1981 – The Garland (BBC, Play for Today; co-written with H. O. Nazareth; starring Paul Anil, Adrian Bracken, Ishaq Bux)
- 1984 – Street Art (documentary, Channel 4; director)
- 1985 – Music Fusion (documentary, Channel 4; director)
- 1985 – Dabbawallahs (Channel 4; director, produced by Anabelle Alcazar Ové)
- 1985 – Who Shall We Tell? (documentary, Channel 4; director, produced by Anabelle Alcazar Ové)
- 1987 – Playing Away (feature film, Channel 4; director)
- 1991 – The Orchid House (TV series, adapted from the 1953 novel of the same name by Phyllis Shand Allfrey)
- 1996 – The Equalizer (director) - episode in the Hidden Empire series.
- 2003 – Dream To Change the World (a tribute to John La Rose; director)
- 2007 – The Ghost of Hing King Estate (director)

== Selected exhibitions ==
- 1984 – Breaking Loose: Horace Ove, The Photographers' Gallery
- 1987 – Farewell to the Flesh, Cornerhouse, Manchester
- 2004 – Pressure: Photographs by Horace Ové (touring)

== Publications ==
- Jim Waters and David Bailey (eds), Pressure: Photographs by Horace Ove, Nottingham City Museums & Galleries, 2004. ISBN 978-0905634678
