= Nina Kellgren =

British cinematographer

- Born: 26 August 1948 (age 78); Manchester, England
- Education: Slade School of Fine Art
- Years active: 198?–present
- Organisation: British Society of Cinematographers
- Father: Jonas Kellgren

Nina Kellgren (born 26 August 1948) is a British cinematographer. Her work on Solomon & Gaenor (1999) made her the first British woman cinematographer to shoot an Academy Award-nominated film and the second woman in the International Feature Film category. Kellgren, the second woman to join the British Society of Cinematographers, was honoured with the John Alcott Memorial Award at the 2021 BSC Awards.

== Early life ==
Kellgren was born in Manchester to Jonas Kellgren, a British physician of Swedish and Russian descent, and Thelma Reynolds, an American nurse of English descent from Amesbury, Massachusetts. She has three sisters as well as a half-sister from her father's previous marriage. Kellgren holds a Bachelor and a Master of Fine Arts from University College London's Slade School of Fine Art, having completed her studies in 1972. She got her first job as a camera assistant for Diane Tammes.

== Filmography ==
Year	Title	Director	Notes
1989	Looking for Langston	Isaac Julien	
1989	I'm British But...	Gurinder Chadha	Television film
1991	Young Soul Rebels	Isaac Julien	
1995	Y Mapiwr	Endaf Emlyn	
1995	Frantz Fanon: Black Skin, White Mask	Isaac Julien	Docudrama
1997	Cold Enough for Snow	Piers Haggard	Television film
1997	Beyond Fear	Jenny Wilkes	Television film
1999	Solomon & Gaenor	Paul Morrison	
2003	Wondrous Oblivion	Paul Morrison	
2003	The Private Life of Samuel Pepys	Oliver Parker	Television film
2006	Deep Water	Jerry Rothwell and Louise Osmond	Documentary
2008	Derek	Isaac Julien	Documentary

== Awards and nominations ==
Year	Award	Category	Work	Result	Ref
1995	RTS Awards	Best Camera	Y Mapiwr	Nominated	
1997	BAFTA Cymru	Best Cinematography – Drama	Y Mapiwr	Won	
2001	BAFTA Cymru	Best Cinematography – Drama	Solomon & Gaenor	Won	
