= 21st GLAAD Media Awards =

2010 annual presentation of the media awards

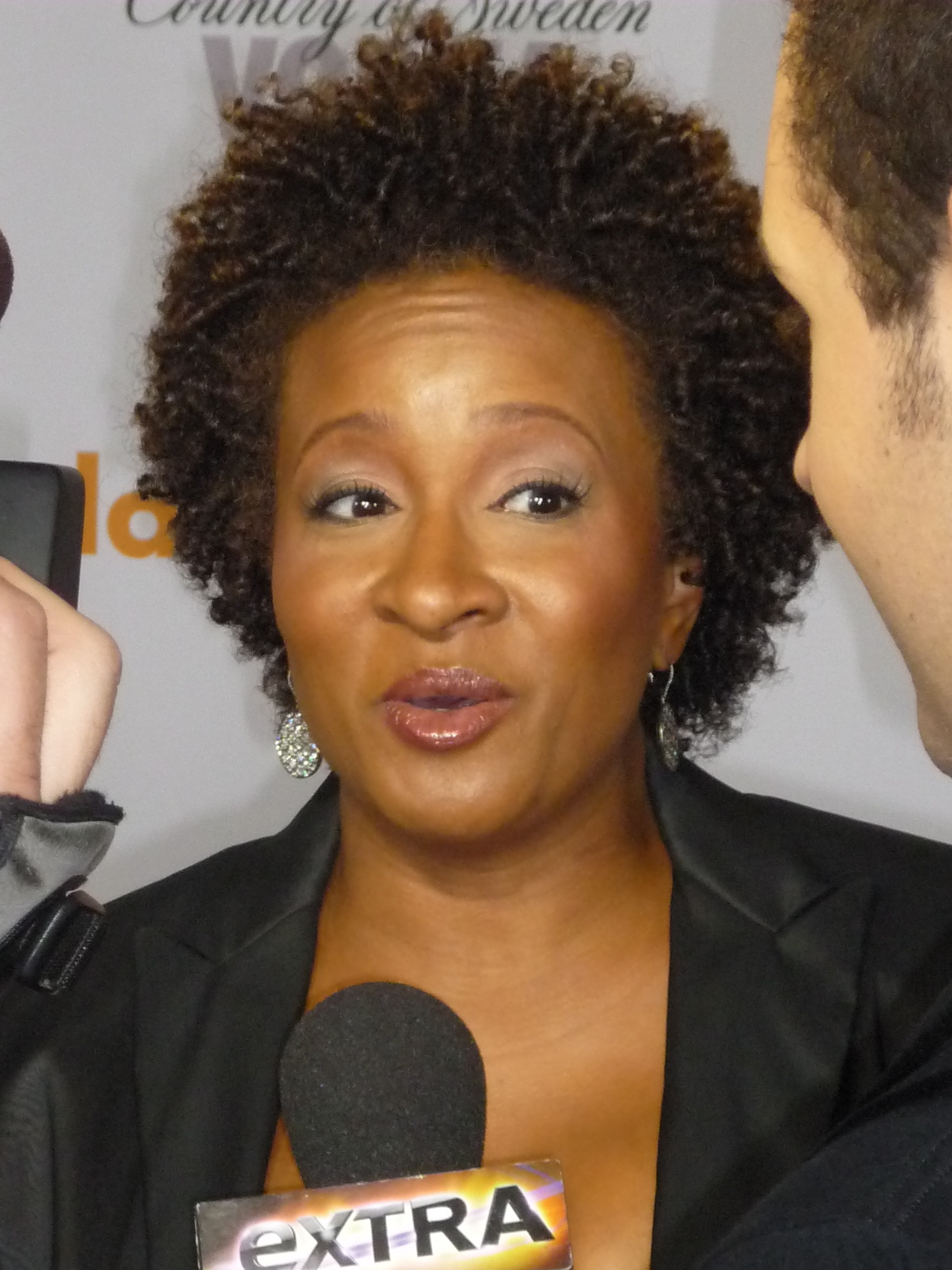
Stephen F. Kolzak Award recipient, Wanda Sykes at the 21st GLAAD Media Awards, Los Angeles, April 18, 2010.

The 21st GLAAD Media Awards was the 2010 annual presentation of the media awards presented by the Gay & Lesbian Alliance Against Defamation. The awards seek to honor films, television shows, musicians and works of journalism that fairly and accurately represent the LGBT community and issues relevant to the community. The 21st annual award ceremony included 116 nominees in 24 English-language categories, and 36 Spanish-language nominees in eight categories.

The awards were presented in three separate shows: one in New York City on March 13, one in Los Angeles on April 18, and one in San Francisco on June 5. The Los Angeles event was hosted by Candis Cayne and Wilson Cruz. Alan Cumming hosted the New York awards, and Bruce Vilanch hosted the San Francisco event. Additional guests and presenters included Elizabeth Keener, Tom Ford, Benjamin Bratt and Rob Halford.

Comedian Wanda Sykes received the Stephen F. Kolzak Award, which is presented to an openly gay media professional who has made a difference promoting and advancing equal rights in the community. Sykes publicly came out in 2008 at a Las Vegas rally. She said of receiving the award, "I greatly appreciate the work that GLAAD continues to do, promoting equality, fair representation and tolerance for our LGBT community. I just pray that I don't ruin what GLAAD has achieved with all of my shenanigans."

Actress Drew Barrymore received the Vanguard Award, which is presented to media professionals who have increased the visibility and understanding of the gay community. Barrymore was selected for her portrayal of a lesbian daughter of a widower in the film Everybody's Fine, as well as her vocal support for same sex marriage. Barrymore said, "I was born, bred and raised among diversity, it has defined me and made me the person I am today. I'm honored and humbled to be receiving this award." Actress Cynthia Nixon also received the Vito Russo Award, and the musical Hair received a special recognition.

== Nominees ==
Winning nominees are indicated by bold text.

Outstanding Film – Wide Release

- Everybody's Fine – Miramax Films
- I Love You, Man – DreamWorks
- Precious – Lions Gate Entertainment
- A Single Man – The Weinstein Company
- Taking Woodstock – Focus Features

Outstanding Film – Limited Release

- Casi Divas – Maya Entertainment
- The Country Teacher – Film Movement
- Little Ashes – Regent Releasing
- Phoebe in Wonderland – THINKFilm
- The Secrets – Monterey Media

Outstanding Drama Series

- Brothers & Sisters – ABC
- Grey's Anatomy – ABC
- Mad Men – AMC
- Skins – BBC America
- True Blood – HBO

Outstanding Comedy Series

- Beautiful People – Logo
- Glee – Fox
- Greek – ABC Family
- Modern Family – ABC
- United States of Tara – Showtime

Outstanding Individual Episode (in a series without a regular LGBT character)

- "Homeward Bound", Private Practice – ABC
- "Lisa Says", The Listener – NBC
- "Pawnee Zoo", Parks and Recreation – NBC
- "The Real Ghostbusters", Supernatural – The CW
- "Wait and See", Private Practice – ABC

Outstanding TV Movie or Mini-Series

- An Englishman in New York – Logo
- Pedro – MTV
- Prayers for Bobby – Lifetime
- Children of Earth – BBC America

Outstanding Documentary

- Ask Not – PBS
- Be Like Others – HBO
- Derek – Sundance Channel
- The Topp Twins: Untouchable Girls – Diva Productions
- U People – Logo/VH1

Outstanding Reality Program

- The Amazing Race 15 – CBS
- Kathy Griffin: My Life on the D-List – Bravo
- Making His Band – MTV
- The Real World: Brooklyn – MTV
- RuPaul's Drag Race – Logo/VH1

Outstanding Daily Drama

- All My Children – ABC
- As the World Turns – CBS
- Guiding Light – CBS
- One Life to Live – ABC

Outstanding Music Artist

- Brandi Carlile – Give Up the Ghost (Sony Music Entertainment)
- Lady Gaga – The Fame Monster (Interscope Records)
- Gossip – Music for Men (Sony Music Entertainment)
- Adam Lambert – For Your Entertainment (19 Recordings/RCA Records)
- Otep – Smash the Control Machine (Victory Records)

Outstanding Talk Show Episode

- "Ellen DeGeneres and Her Wife, Portia de Rossi" – The Oprah Winfrey Show (syndicated)
- "Hell to Pay – Gay Teen Exorcism" – The Tyra Banks Show (The CW)
- "Mormon Church & Gays" – The Joy Behar Show (HLN)
- "The Science of Intersex" – The Dr. Oz Show (syndicated)
- "Sirdeaner Walker Interview" – The Ellen DeGeneres Show (syndicated)

Outstanding TV Journalism – Newsmagazine

- "40th Anniversary of Stonewall" – In the Life (PBS)
- "Angie Zapata Murder Trial" – InSession (truTV)
- "Bullied to Death?" – Anderson Cooper 360° (CNN)
- "Gay Killings in Iraq" – CNN Newsroom (CNN)
- "Uganda Be Kidding Me" – The Rachel Maddow Show (MSNBC)

Outstanding TV Journalism Segment

- "Gay Teen Mutilated" – Issues with Jane Velez-Mitchell (HLN)
- "Lt. Col. Victor Fehrenbach 'I Was Utterly Devastated'" – CNN Newsroom (CNN)
- "Reverend's Revelation: Minister Speaks Out About Being Transgender" – The Early Show (CBS)
- "Total Transformation: Why Chaz Bono Decided to Change" – Good Morning America (ABC)
- "Why Will Won't Pledge Allegiance" – American Morning (CNN)

Outstanding Newspaper Article

- "Binational, Same-Sex Couples Face Immigration Problems" – Mike Swift (San Jose Mercury News)
- "Kept From a Dying Partner's Bedside" – Tara Parker-Pope (The New York Times)
- "Militias Target Some Iraqis for Being Gay" – Paul Wiseman and Nadeem Majeed (USA Today)
- "Minister Kept Secret for 27 Years" – Christine McFadden (Portland Tribune)
- "Transgender Vets a Hidden Population" – Carol Ann Alaimo (Arizona Daily Star)

Outstanding Newspaper Columnist

- Leonard Pitts – The Miami Herald
- Deb Price – The Detroit News
- Frank Rich – The New York Times
- Rev. Byron Williams – The Oakland Tribune
- Craig Wilson – USA Today

Outstanding Newspaper Overall Coverage

- Greeley Tribune
- Los Angeles Times
- The New York Times
- Portland Press Herald
- The Washington Post

Outstanding Magazine Article

- "Coming Out in Middle School" – Benoit Denizet-Lewis (The New York Times Magazine)
- "Either/Or: Sports, Sex and the Case of Caster Semenya" – Ariel Levy (The New Yorker)
- "Gay on Trial" – Gabriel Arana (The American Prospect)
- "Trouble in Paradise" – Jeannine Amber (Essence)
- "What's Right with Utah" – Lisa Duggan (The Nation)

Outstanding Magazine Overall Coverage

- The Advocate
- Entertainment Weekly
- The Nation
- Newsweek
- People

Outstanding Digital Journalism Article

- "Former College Football Captain Was Openly Gay" – Cyd Zeigler, Jr. (Outsports.com)
- "McMackin's Slur Reveals Larger Problem" – LZ Granderson (ESPN.com)
- "On the Road to Refuge" – Pete Muller (ColorLines.com)
- "'We Love You, This Won't Change a Thing'" – John Buccigross (ESPN.com)
- "Why Can't You Just Butch Up? Gay Men, Effeminacy, and Our War with Ourselves" – Brent Hartinger (AfterElton.com)

Outstanding Digital Journalism – Multimedia

- "AIDS Lifecycle: On the Road" – Derrick Shore (Advocate.com)
- "From Stonewall to Mainstream" – Jessica Bennett and Rebecca Shabad, photos by Kathy Jones and Margaret Keady, video by Jennifer Molina (Newsweek.com)
- "The Stonewall Riots: 40 Years Later" – Dave Singleton (AARP.org)

Outstanding Comic Book

- Buffy the Vampire Slayer – Jane Espenson, Steven S. DeKnight, Drew Greenberg, Jim Krueger, Doug Petrie, Joss Whedon (Dark Horse Comics)
- Detective Comics by Greg Rucka (DC Comics)
- Madame Xanadu – Matt Wagner (Vertigo/DC Comics)
- Secret Six – Gail Simone (DC Comics)
- X-Factor – Peter David (Marvel Comics)

Outstanding Los Angeles Theater

- 40 is the New 15 – book and lyrics by Larry Todd Johnson, music by Cindy O'Connor
- Anita Bryant Died for Your Sins – Brian Christopher Williams
- Battle Hymn – Jim Leonard
- Bingo with the Indians by Adam Rapp
- Lydia by Octavio Solis

Outstanding New York Theater: Broadway & Off-Broadway

- A Boy and His Soul – Colman Domingo
- The Brother/Sister Plays – Tarell Alvin McCraney
- Next Fall – Geoffrey Nauffts
- Soul Samurai – Qui Nguyen
- The Temperamentals – Jon Marans

Outstanding New York Theater: Off-Off Broadway

- Abraham Lincoln's Big Gay Dance Party – Aaron Loeb
- Devil Boys From Beyond – Buddy Thomas and Kenneth Elliott
- The Lily's Revenge – Taylor Mac
- She Like Girls – Chisa Hutchinson
- Wickets – Clove Galilee and Jenny Rogers, adapted from Fefu and Her Friends by María Irene Fornés
