= Kellgren =

Kellgren is a surname. Notable people with the surname include:

- Christer Kellgren (born 1958), Swedish ice hockey player
- Gary Kellgren (1939–1977), American audio engineer
- George Kellgren (born 1943), Swedish firearms designer
- Henry Kellgren (1886–1954), Swedish military officer
- Jessica Kellgren-Fozard (born 1989), English YouTuber
- Johan Henric Kellgren (1751–1795), Swedish poet and critic
- Jonas Kellgren (1911–2002), British physician
- Katherine Kellgren (1969–2018), American narrator
