= Tim Potter =

English actor (born 1959)

Tim Potter (born Nottingam, 1959) is an English actor in film, television, and theatre since the 1980s.

== Career ==
=== Stage ===
Potter's stage work includes playing the role of Salvador Dalí in the original production of Terry Johnson's Hysteria at the Royal Court in 1993, and Charles II in Stephen Jeffreys' The Libertine the following year. He has appeared in productions of plays by Edward Bond, Oscar Wilde, Dario Fo, Tennessee Williams, Samuel Beckett, Shakespeare, George Etherege and Jim Cartwright. and worked for directors including Sam Mendes, Phyllida Lloyd, Neil Bartlett, Ken Russell, Benjamin Ross, Julian Jarrold, Steven Berkoff, Max Stafford-Clark, Philip Prowse, Uberto Pasolini, Deborah Warner and Stephen Frears.

He was a founder member, with Jim Cartwright and Louis Mellis of Acme Acting, a theatre company which performed plays in domestic homes, using the whole house, with the audience following the actors room to room. His roles included Blanche DuBois in A Streetcar Named Desire and Col. Kurtz in Apocalypse Now.

=== Film and television ===
Potter's film roles include the Ghost of Christmas Future in A Christmas Carol (1999) opposite Patrick Stewart, Chief Gentleman in The Prince and the Pauper (2000), and Captain Hook in Finding Neverland (2004), as well as roles in The Young Poisoner's Handbook (1995), Entrapment (1999), Faintheart (2008), Still Life (2013), and the 1999 television movie adaptation of Alice in Wonderland.

== Filmography ==
=== Film ===
| Year | Title | Role | Notes |
|---|---|---|---|
| 1988 | Salome's Last Dance | Pharisee | |
| 1990 | Vroom | Harry | |
| 1995 | The Young Poisoner's Handbook | Simon | |
| 1997 | Fierce Creatures | Vulture Keeper | |
| 1999 | Entrapment | Millennium Man | |
| 1999 | Onegin | Dandy 2 | |
| 2000 | The Nine Lives of Tomas Katz | Apocalyptic nutter | |
| 2003 | Cheeky | Horace | |
| 2004 | Finding Neverland | 'Hook' / Lord Carlton | |
| 2008 | Miss Pettigrew Lives for a Day | Nightclub Patron | |
| 2008 | Faintheart | Headmaster | |
| 2013 | Still Life | Homeless Man | |
| 2015 | A Royal Night Out | Duty Manager | |

=== Television ===
| Year | Title | Role | Notes |
|---|---|---|---|
| 1983 | Walter | Squatters' Adviser | Television film |
| 1983 | Video Stars | Eric Dancer | Television film |
| 1984 | Luna | Rob | Episode: "A Bureaubreau in the Hand Is Worth a Pension" |
| 1984 | Angels in the Annexe | Mr. Lomax | Television film |
| 1985 | Titus Andronicus | Clown | Television film |
| 1985 | Ties of Blood | Cecil | Episode: "The Military Wing" |
| 1985–1986 | I Woke Up One Morning | Irrelevant | 11 episodes |
| 1986 | Dead Head | Teddy | Episode: "The Patriot" |
| 1988 | Wild Things | Hotel Manager | Television film |
| 1990 | Blood Rights | Erich | 2 episodes |
| 1992 | Screen Two | Mr. Bell | Episode: "My Sister-Wife" |
| 1992 | Kinsey | Laurence Donegan | 2 episodes |
| 1992 | Witchcraft | Sealed Knotter | Episode #1.2 |
| 1993 | Lovejoy | Harrison | Episode: "Judgement of Solomon" |
| 1994 | Minder | Lionel | Episode: "Bring Me the Head of Arthur Daley" |
| 1994 | The Chief | Dick Mortimer | Episode #4.10 |
| 1994 | Soldier Soldier | RMP | Episode: "Proud Man" |
| 1997 | The Pale Horse | Dr Osbourne | Television film |
| 1997 | Noah's Ark | Geoffrey Winger | Episode: "Family Matters" |
| 1997 | Beyond Fear | Prison Guard | Television film |
| 1998 | Bramwell | Crispin | Episode: "Loose Women" |
| 1999 | Alice in Wonderland | Knave of Hearts | Television film |
| 1999 | A Christmas Carol | The Ghost of Christmas Yet to Come | Television film |
| 2000 | The Bill | Warren Askew | Episode: "Touch and Go" |
| 2000 | The Prince and the Pauper | Chief Gentleman | Television film |
| 2000 | Second Sight: Parasomnia | Leonard | Television film |
| 2001 | The Infinite Worlds of H. G. Wells | Jim / 2nd Card Player | 6 episodes |
| 2001 | Murder Rooms: Mysteries of the Real Sherlock Holmes | Bolton | Episode: "The Photographer's Chair" |
| 2002 | Crime and Punishment | Nikolai | Television film |
| 2003 | Byron | Millingen | Television film |
| 2005 | According to Bex | The tog rater | Episode: "Stuck in the Middle with You" |
| 2006, 2007 | Trial & Retribution | Dr. Adrian Kinton | 2 episodes |
| 2014 | New Tricks | Bryan Fawson | Episode: "Bermondsey Boy" |
