= Brian Bovell =

British actor (born 1959)

- Born: 26 October 1959 (age 67); London, England, UK
- Occupation: Actor
- Years active: 1980-present

Brian Bovell (born 26 October 1959) is a British theatre, television and film actor. His roles include Rob Thatcher in The Bill, Bishop John Thornber in Coronation Street, Leo Valentine in the soap opera Hollyoaks.

== Background ==
Brian Bovell was an actor in Black Theatre when he appeared in the film, Babylon. As a theatrical actor, he won the Critics Circle Theatre Award for Best Supporting Actor for his part in Where is the Darkness.

Since 1986, he has played three characters in Casualty, and four characters in Doctors.

Bovell was a Celebrity MasterChef semi-finalist in 2017.

== Career ==
=== 1980s ===
Bovell played the part of Spark in the 1980 film, Babylon, which is about Jamaican life in Brixton.

Bovell played the character of Nat west in the 1981/82 film, Burning an Illusion which was directed by Menelik Shabazz.

Acting alongside Gary Olsen, Bovell co-starred in the television series Prospects, a twelve-episode comedy drama, directed by Alan Janes which began in 1986. Olsen was cast as Pincy and Bovell was cast as Billy, two East Londoners who were living on the breadline and always on the lookout to make a quid.

Acting alongside Kate Hardie, Kevin McNally, and Nicky Henson, Bovell played the role of late-night deejay Joe Jeffries in the 1988 Antonia Bird directed miniseries Thin Air.

=== 1990s ===
Bovell played the role of Sammy Dean, the central character in the Lesley Manning directed 1990 serial, Blood Rights. Sammy Dean, a journalist who has become a detective, is hired by the wife of a conservative MP to find their missing daughter.

Bovell had a recurring role as PC Charlie Webb in the television series, The Chief. Bovell also appeared in the 1995 series Welcome II the Terrordome. He acted in the 1996 film, Playing Away which was directed by Horace Ové.

Bovell played Antonio in the BBC Radio version of William Shakespeare's Twelfth Night which was directed by Eoin O’Callaghan. It was broadcast on BBC Radio 3, on 7 May 1998 at 7:30 pm.

=== 2000s – 2020s ===
In 2003, Bovell joined the cast of The Bill as DC Rob Thatcher. He appeared in fifty-seven episodes until his character was killed off in December 2004.

Bovell played the part of Carl Glenn in the television film, McCready and Daughter.

Appearing in Thirteen Steps Down, Bovell guest starred as Tom Akwaa in two episodes that were aired in August 2012.

Bovell played Corporal Marcus Blake in the 2014 play Kingston 14 that was directed by Clint Dyer.

In 2015, Bovell played the part of Ray Wilton in Unforgotten. His role as the bereaved father, who along with his wife Beth cope with their loss by doing community work with troubled teens in their area. Along with Peter Egan, Tom Courtenay, Trevor Eve, Gemma Jones and Ruth Sheen, he was referred to by Hollywood Soapbox as one of the real who’s who of British TV and theatre actors.

From 2016, Bovell played the role of Bishop John Thornber on Coronation Street. Also starting in 2016, Bovell appeared in about 24 episodes as the football coach Mr. Hansard in the series, Jamie Johnson.

Bovell had the recurring role of Solomon in the 2020s series Miss Scarlett.

== Filmography ==
=== Television ===
Year(s)	Programme	Role
2026	Benidorm Is Murder	Archie
2026	Breach	Interrogator
2026	Bridgerton	John's Uncle
2025	The Famous Five	Jeremiah
2025	The Chelsea Detective	Billy Ford
2024	Silo	Barney
2023	Vera	Sam Hampton
2023	Ghosts	Antique Expert
2023	Grantchester	Bernie Palmer
2023	Malpractice	Sir Anthony Owusu
2022-2025	Miss Scarlet	Solomon
2021	Crime	George Marsden
2021	Foundation	Trantorian Seer Priest
2021	Jerk	Immigration Officer
2021	Shadow and Bone	Innkeeper
2021	Midsomer Murders	Eric Gladberry
2020	Flesh and Blood	Therapist
2017	The Other One	Rupert
2017	C.B. Strike	Derrick Wilson
2016	The Missing	Henry Reed
2016-2022	Jamie Johnson	Mr Hansard
2016-2018	Coronation Street	Bishop John Thornber
2015	Unforgotten	Ray Wilton
2015	Death in Paradise	Erol Dumas
2012	13 Steps Down	Tom Akwaa
2007	Humf	(voice)
2006-2010	Hollyoaks	Leo Valentine
2006	Judge John Deed	Brian Mansridge
2003	Silent Witness	Derek Johns
2003	My Dad's the Prime Minister	Detective Andy Sharp
2003	In Deep	Brigstock
2002-2024	Doctors	Various
2002-2014	Holby City	Various
2000	Lock, Stock...	Bunny
1999-2001	Gimme Gimme Gimme	Jez
1998-1991	Whizziwig	Daniel Sinclair
1998	Maisie Raine	D.C. Stephen Homes
1995	Class Act	Don Walsh
1995	The Imaginatively Titled Punt & Dennis Show	
1995	The Chief	PC Charlie Webb
1994	A Touch of Frost	Terry Bamtema
1993	Between the Lines	David Baron
1993	Drop the Dead Donkey	Barry
1993	Inspector Morse	Pierre
1992-1993	Screen One	Driver 3, DS Ibbotsen
1990	Blood Rights	Sammy Dean
1990	4 Play	Richard
1989-2004	The Bill	Various
1989	Bangkok Hilton	Postman
1989	High Street Blues	Disc Jockey
1988-1990	South of the Border	Fitz
1988	Thin Air	Joe Jefferies
1986-2024	Casualty	Various
1986-1987	Tickle on the Tum	Gary Ball
1986	Prospects	Billy
1985	Bulman	Car Park Attendant
1984	Driving Ambition	Bill
1984	Miracles Take Longer	Trafford Garfield
1983	The Hard Word	Lenny
1982	The Gentle Touch	Mark Livesey
1980	Strangers	Youth
