= Valentine Nonyela =

Nigerian–British actor (born 1969)

- Born: 23 September 1969 (age 56)
- Occupation: Actor
- Years active: 1986–present

Valentine Nonyela (born 23 September 1969) is a Nigerian–British actor. He appeared in many TV programs of the late 1980s and 1990s, including BBC television series South of the Border, The Bill, London's Burning, Holby City and A Touch of Frost. Apart from his career in the television industry, he also co-starred in several films, like the Isaac Julien film Young Soul Rebels and the James Bond film Casino Royale.

In 2010 he appeared in ITV's House Guest In The Sun, saying that he lives in Cyprus with his wife and two children named Ramai Nonyelu and Arinze-Tross Nonyelu. He used to work at the International School of Paphos.

== Career ==
Valentine Nonyela's career spans acting, producing, and contributions to the film industry. Apart from his roles in television and film, Nonyela has engaged in the cinematic community through various platforms.

== Recent Work ==
Nonyela has been active in the film industry in recent years from a different vantage point. Speaking at the 16th Cyprus International Film Festival, he shared his optimistic outlook on the future of filmmaking. Valentine Nonyela, a British producer residing in Cyprus, expressed his views on the film industry at the festival, highlighting the potential for a new era of international, independent filmmaking. He emphasized the exciting opportunities for storytelling diversity in the age of streaming and audience fragmentation, suggesting that local stories can hold as much power as Hollywood narratives.

== Filmography ==
Year	Title	Role	Notes
1991	Young Soul Rebels	Chris	
1995	Welcome II the Terrordome	Spike / African Man	
2006	Casino Royale	Nambutu Ambassador	(final film role)
