= Maureen Blackwood =

Black British filmmaker (born 1960)

- Born: 30 July 1960 (age 65); London, England
- Other name: Mo Blackwood
- Education: City of London Polytechnic
- Occupations: Filmmaker, Script Development Executive
- Known for: Founding member of Sankofa Film and Video Collective
- Notable work: The Passion of Remembrance (1987)

Maureen Blackwood (born 30 July 1960) is a British filmmaker and founding member of Sankofa Film and Video Collective – a collective dedicated to promoting and producing black films by black directors. Her films consist of experimental narrative and documentary works that examine black life in Britain from a variety of perspectives.

== Life and career ==
Born in London, England, to Jamaican parents, Blackwood attended City and Islington College in London, followed by the University of Westminster (then Polytechnic of Central London), at which she obtained a degree in Media studies.

One of her tutors introduced her to an African-American man who worked at the British Film Institute named Jim Pines. He in turn introduced her to Isaac Julien, Martina Attille, Nadine Marsh-Edwards and Robert Crusz, with whom she founded Sankofa Film and Video Collective in 1983.

Her only feature is The Passion of Remembrance (1987), co-written and co-directed with Julien. She followed this up with the narrative shorts Perfect Image? (1988) and Home away from Home (1993), and the documentary A Family Called Abrew (1992). Home away from Home was an official selection for Critics' Week at the 1994 Cannes Film Festival.

She was a young member of the Camden Black Sisters, and used stories of older members in the film The Passion of Remembrance.

In 2003, she graduated from a year-long Script Development Executive Training Initiative backed by UK Film Council. She then went on to work as a Script Development Executive for several companies, including Forest Whitaker's Spirit Dance UK.

Credited as Mo Blackwood, she co-wrote the feature-length screenplay Shop of Dreams (2005) for the Estonian production company Exit Films.

In 2005, she was selected to take part in a ten-day workshop with the Iranian director Abbas Kiarostami. Blackwood's short film Lift Stories from the workshop was one of four films selected by Channel Four to screen as part of 3 Minute Wonder.

== Filmography ==
- The Passion of Remembrance (1987)
- Perfect Image? (1988)
- A Family Called Abrew (1992)
- Home away from Home (1993)
- Lift Stories (2005)
