= Australian Cinémathèque =

Institution of film in Brisbane

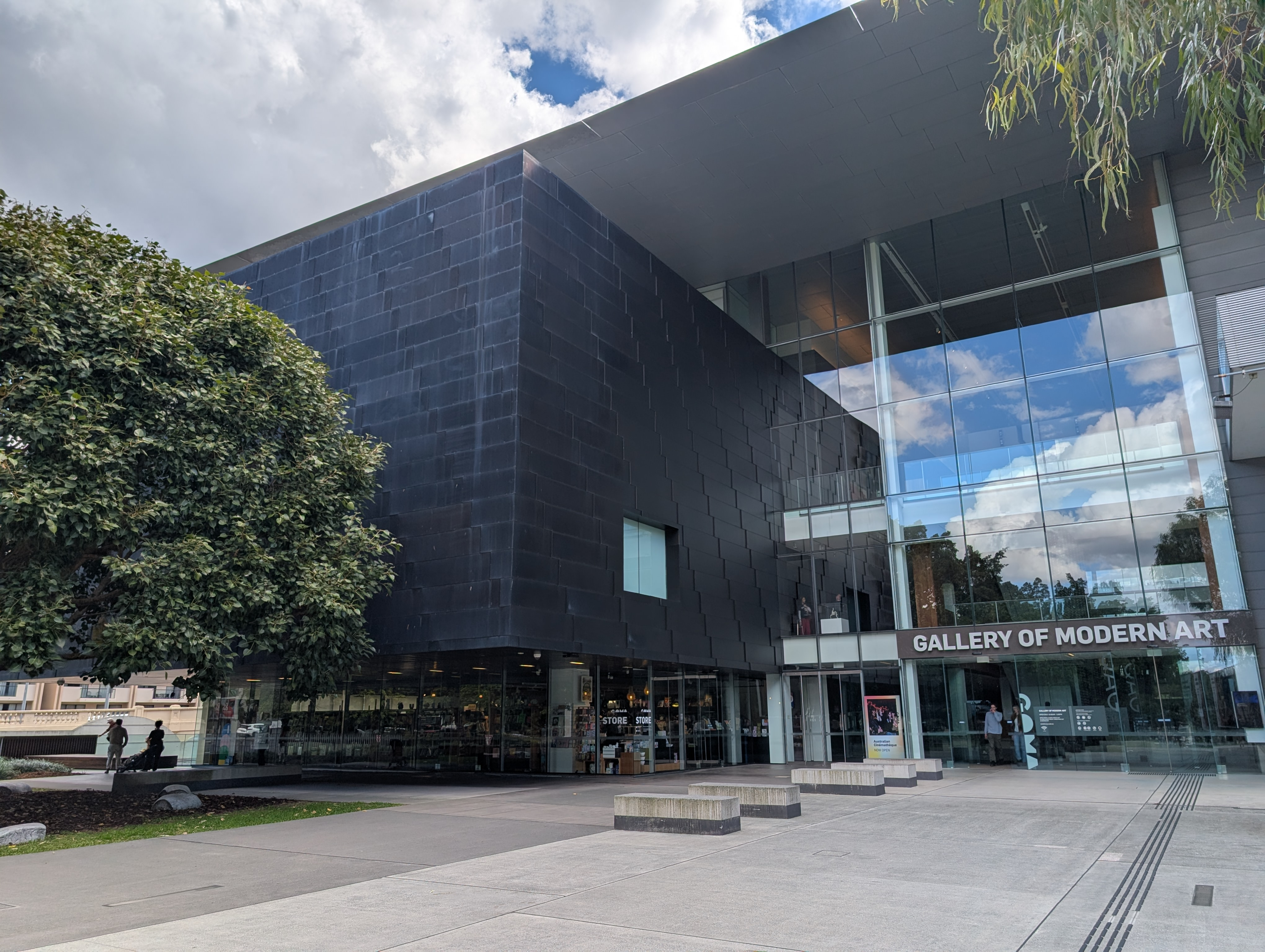
- The Australian Cinémathèque, as seen from the entrance of the Gallery of Modern Art, in 2026
- Interactive map of Australian Cinémathèque
- Location: Gallery of Modern Art (GOMA), South Bank, Brisbane, Australia
- Coordinates: 27.4726°S 153.01828°E
- Owner: QAGOMA
- Capacity: Cinema A: 220 seats; Cinema B: 110 seats
- Type: Public cinema within an art museum
- Screen: 2

Construction
- Opened: 2006

Website
- Australian Cinémathèque official website

The Australian Cinémathèque is a public film institution at the Gallery of Modern Art (GOMA) in Brisbane, Queensland. It is Australia's only purpose-built cinema within an art museum, providing an ongoing program of international, experimental and cult film, including rare 35mm prints and recent restorations.

== Overview ==
The Australian Cinémathèque occupies two purpose-built cinemas on the ground floor of GOMA: Cinema A, seating 220, and Cinema B, seating 110. Both are equipped to project the full range of film formats including 35mm, 16mm, celluloid as well as digital, a capability shared by few other Australian venues. It is equipped with a restored 1929 Wurlitzer organ and hosts live musical accompaniment for selected screenings, performed by commissioned musicians on the organ or other instruments.

Screenings are held on Wednesday and Friday evenings and Saturday and Sunday matinees. Many sessions are free to the public.

== History ==
=== Origins ===
The foundations of the Cinémathèque emerged in the 1990s, when the Queensland Art Gallery (QAG) began collecting video art and presenting moving-image exhibitions as part of the Asia Pacific Triennial of Contemporary Art (APT). Recognising the need for dedicated screening spaces, the Queensland Government incorporated a cinematheque into plans for the new Gallery of Modern Art, established at Kurilpa Point.

=== Establishment at GOMA ===
The Queensland Government allocated A$260 million from the 1999 State Budget toward the new gallery, with the Cinémathèque specified as a core feature of the building alongside production facilities and a media gallery. Sydney firm Architectus, in association with Davenport Campbell and Partners, was selected as the building's architect in July 2002, following an international design competition.

The Cinémathèque was formally established in 2005, when an inaugural program of experimental film and moving-image art was presented ahead of GOMA's completion. Its two purpose-built cinemas opened to the public with GOMA's official opening in December 2006. The venue operates as a distinct curatorial department within QAGOMA, alongside departments for Australian Art, Asian and Pacific Art, International Art and Conservation and Registration, reporting through the Gallery's Collection and Exhibitions division.

=== Wurlitzer Organ ===
The Cinémathèque's Cinema A houses a 1929 Wurlitzer Style 260 Opus 2040 Pipe Organ, originally installed in Brisbane's Regent Theatre in 1929. The organ remained at the Regent until 1964, when it was removed into private ownership; it was subsequently negotiated back to Queensland in 2004, restored, and installed at GOMA alongside the building's opening in December 2006.

== Programming ==
The Cinémathèque's programming has combined exhibition-tied film seasons with standalone retrospectives since opening. Early examples include a 2009 program of Andy Warhol's moving-image work, presented alongside a major exhibition of his art, and retrospectives of Portuguese filmmakers Pedro Costa and Pere Portabella, the latter curated by Mark Nash of London's Royal College of Art. Breathless: French New Wave turns 50 surveyed the Nouvelle Vague, and Be Afraid: Fear in North American Cinema was the venue's first genre-themed program. A season of David Lynch's films was presented alongside a major exhibition of his visual art at GOMA in 2015. Melting into Air, comprising 57 films, was presented alongside GOMA's Air exhibition in 2022-23. In 2024, the Cinémathèque presented retrospectives of Robert Bresson and of Powell and Pressburger; the Bresson season included a rare 35 mm print of The Devil, Probably, borrowed from the Cinémathèque Française archive with permission from Bresson's widow, Mylène Bresson. A near-complete career survey of Tsai Ming-liang was presented later that year as part of Asia Pacific Triennial Cinema, and The Cracked Actor: Bowie on Screen surveyed David Bowie's screen performances, including Cracked Actor (1975), The Man Who Fell to Earth (1976) and Labyrinth (1986).

In-person filmmaker appearances have also recurred throughout the Cinémathèque's history. In 2009, a retrospective of Peter Greenaway's films was accompanied by a live VJ performance from Greenaway himself in GOMA's Long Gallery, as part of that year's Brisbane Festival. Academy Award–winning Australian cinematographer John Seale appeared in person for an In Conversation event alongside a retrospective of his work in 2023. Tsai Ming-liang appeared in person for an Australian-exclusive In Conversation event as part of the 2024 retrospective and in 2025 composer Eiko Ishibashi presented GIFT, a live reworking of footage from Academy Award–winning filmmaker Ryusuke Hamaguchi's Evil Does Not Exist.

Asia Pacific Triennial Cinema is the Cinémathèque's recurring film program presented alongside each edition of the Asia Pacific Triennial of Contemporary Art.For the 11th Triennial, the program comprised more than 110 feature, documentary and short films between November 2024 and May 2025, including filmmaker surveys spotlighting Kamila Andini, among others.

=== Festivals and partnerships ===
The Cinémathèque has served as the principal Brisbane venue for the Brisbane International Film Festival (BIFF), including its 2018–2020 editions. It is an Associate Member of the International Federation of Film Archives (FIAF). The Cinémathèque also maintains ongoing partnerships with a range of festival and cultural organisations, including the National Film and Sound Archive, Alliance Française de Brisbane, the Brisbane Asia Pacific Film Festival, the Japanese Film Festival Australia, the Queensland Film Festival, the New Caledonia Film Festival, the Czech and Slovak Film Festival of Australia, and the World Science Festival Brisbane.
