= South of the Border (TV series) =

British television series

- Genre: Detective
- Created by: Susan Wilkins
- Written by: Susan Wilkins
- Starring: Buki Armstrong; Rosie Rowell; Dinah Stabb; Valentine Nonyela; Jimmi Harkishin; Brian Bovell; Corinne Skinner-Carter; Q Saul Jephcott; Alwyne Taylor
- Theme music composer: Ruby Turner (Series 1); Alison Limerick (Series 2)
- Composer: Alan Lisk
- Country of origin: United Kingdom
- Original language: English
- No. of series: 2
- No. of episodes: 15

Production
- Producer: Caroline Oulton
- Production locations: South London, England, UK
- Running time: 50 minutes
- Production company: BBC

Original release
- Network: BBC1
- Release: 25 October 1988 – 22 June 1990

South of the Border is a British television detective drama series, created and written by Susan Wilkins, that first broadcast on BBC1, and ran for two series between 25 October 1988 and 22 June 1990. The series starred Buki Armstrong as Pearl Parker, a black woman. In the first and second series, she works alongside Finn Gallagher (Rosie Rowell).

Dinah Stabb, Valentine Nonyela, Jimmi Harkishin, Brian Bovell, Corinne Skinner-Carter, Saul Jephcott and Alwyne Taylor all co-starred in all series.

== Plot summary ==
The drama series follows pair of female private detectives, Pearl Parker (Buki Armstrong) and Finn Gallagher (Rosie Rowell) operating within the multicultural communities of South London. Former school friends, a secretary and a tearaway, Pearl and Finn decide to set up as private investigators after demonstrating a flair for sleuthing.

== Cast ==
- Buki Armstrong as Pearl Parker
- Rosie Rowell as Finn Gallagher
- Dinah Stabb as Francesca "Milly" Millington
- Valentine Nonyela as Rufus Parker
- Jimmi Harkishin as Krishnan Vore
- Brian Bovell as Fitz
- Corinne Skinner-Carter as Rose Parker
- Q as Denzil
- Saul Jephcott as Detective Inspector Lawrence Warner
- Alwyne Taylor as Detective Sergeant Marsh

== Episodes ==
=== Series overview ===
Series	Episodes	Originally released	
Series	Episodes	First released	Last released
1	8	25 October 1988	13 December 1988
2	7	11 May 1990	22 June 1990

=== Series 1 (1988) ===
No.	Title	Directed by	Written by	British air date
1	"Episode 1"	Antonia Bird	Susan Wilkins	25 October 1988
2	"Episode 2"	Udayan Prasad	Susan Wilkins	1 November 1988
3	"Episode 3"	Wilfred Emmanuel-Jones	Susan Wilkins	8 November 1988
4	"Episode 4"	Udayan Prasad	Tony Dennis	15 November 1988
5	"Episode 5"	Antonia Bird	Susan Wilkins	22 November 1988
6	"Episode 6"	Lesley Manning	Ayshe Raif	29 November 1988
7	"Episode 7"	Udayan Prasad	Winsome Pinnock	6 December 1988
8	"Episode 8"	Antonia Bird	Susan Wilkins	13 December 1988

=== Series 2 (1990) ===
No.	Title	Directed by	Written by	British air date
1	"Episode 1"	Lesley Manning	Tony Dennis	11 May 1990
2	"Episode 2"	Lesley Manning	Tony Dennis	18 May 1990
3	"Episode 3"	Steve Hilliker	Q	25 May 1990
4	"Episode 4"	Suri Krishnamma	Barbara Machin	1 June 1990
5	"Episode 5"	Laura Sims	Barbara Machin	8 June 1990
6	"Episode 6"	Ngozi Onwurah	Jon Paul Morgan	15 June 1990
7	"Episode 7"	Lesley Manning	Michael Ellis	22 June 1990

== Reception ==
The series received mostly positive reviews. Nostalgia Central praised the series' casting, characterization, production values and writing, concluding the protagonists' "unsystematic approach made a refreshing change from the 'kick-in- the-door-and-yell-freeze' routine so often employed." In her monograph Representing Black Britain, Sarita Malik writes that "brought a touch of contemporary realism to the adventure/crime series while also subverting its traditional White, male dominance. These varying discourses – multicultural, social-conscience, politically divisive, crossover – emerged out of the divergent 1980s context of public anti-racist struggle, ethnic minority cultural politics, targeted programming and mounting commercial pressure."
