= Blood Rights =

British television series

- Genre: Thriller
- Based on: Blood Rights by Mike Phillips
- Written by: Mike Phillips
- Directed by: Lesley Manning
- Starring: Brian Bovell; Maggie Steed; Struan Rodger; DeObia Oparei; Akim Mogaji; Robert Glenister; Hermione Norris; Margo Gunn; Sam Kelly; Tim Potter; Warren Morson; Julia St John
- Composers: Joe Bashorun; Orphy Robinson
- Country of origin: United Kingdom
- Original language: English
- No. of series: 1
- No. of episodes: 3

Production
- Producer: Caroline Oulton
- Production locations: London, England, UK
- Cinematography: Rex Maidment
- Running time: 55 minutes
- Production company: BBC

Original release
- Network: BBC2
- Release: 24 October – 7 November 1990

Blood Rights is a British television thriller drama miniseries written by Mike Phillips that first broadcast on BBC2 between 24 October and 7 November 1990, and ran for three weeks on Wednesday nights. The series comprising three episodes was based on the 1989 novel of the same name by Phillips. All three episodes were directed by Lesley Manning, with Caroline Oulton acting as executive producer.

The series starred Brian Bovell as Sam Dean, a British journalist, who is hired by a prominent Conservative Member of Parliament to find his missing, drug-addicted daughter. Dean's investigation uncovers a darker world of drugs, blackmail and prostitution.

== Plot ==
A journalist investigates the disappearance of the drug addicted daughter of a prominent Tory MP, a case that plunges him into the complex and gritty underbelly of 1980s London's multicultural and political scenes.

== Cast ==
- Brian Bovell as Sam (Sammy) Dean
- Maggie Steed as Tess Barker
- Struan Rodger as Grenville Barker
- DeObia Oparei as Winston
- Akim Mogaji as Roy
- Robert Glenister as Pete
- Hermione Norris as Virginia Barker
- Margo Gunn as Gillian
- Sam Kelly as Evans
- Tim Potter as Erich
- Warren Morson as Chris
- Julia St John as Lynn

== Episodes ==
No.	Title	Directed by	Written by	Original release date
1	"Part 1"	Lesley Manning	Mike Phillips	24 October 1990
Black journalist Sammy Dean is hired by a prominent MP to find his missing daughter.
2	"Part 2"	Lesley Manning	Mike Phillips	31 October 1990
Virginia Barker has joined forces with her brother to extort money from her MP father.
3	"Part 3"	Lesley Manning	Mike Phillips	7 November 1990
Sammy searches for Virginia Barker who has been abducted by a gun-toting villain, with the MP's deviant son in tow. Meanwhile, Tess decides to meet the kidnapper alone in the family's cottage.

== Home media ==
The series has never been re-broadcast or released on home video.
