= Solomon & Gaenor =

- Directed by: Paul Morrison
- Written by: Paul Morrison
- Produced by: Sheryl Crown
- Starring: Ioan Gruffudd; Nia Roberts; Sue Jones-Davies; William Thomas; Mark Lewis Jones; Maureen Lipman; David Horovitch
- Cinematography: Nina Kellgren
- Edited by: Kant Pan
- Music by: Ilona Sekacz
- Distributed by: FilmFour Distributors
- Release date: 30 April 1999
- Running time: 105 min.
- Country: United Kingdom
- Languages: Welsh; English; Yiddish
- Box office: $165,485

Solomon & Gaenor (Welsh: Solomon a Gaenor) is a 1999 Welsh film written and directed by British filmmaker Paul Morrison. It stars Ioan Gruffudd as Solomon Lewinsky, an Orthodox Jewish man in early 20th-century Wales who falls in love with a gentile woman named Gaenor Rees, played by Nia Roberts. They enter into a forbidden love affair, which has tragic consequences.

The Welsh-language version was nominated for Best Foreign Language Film at the 72nd Academy Awards.

== Plot ==
In 1911, Solomon Levinsky, a young Orthodox Jew, lives with his Yiddish-speaking family in the South Wales Valleys. Solomon peddles fabrics door to door but hides his ethnicity due to anti-Semitism. One day, Solomon meets a demure, young gentile woman named Gaenor Rees and instantly falls in love with her. Solomon tells Gaenor his name is Sam Livingstone and that his family is English.

Solomon returns after having made Gaenor a red dress and has her try it on. Struck by how beautiful Gaenor looks, Solomon and Gaenor share their first kiss.

Gaenor's father, Idris, finds the red dress and demands to know who gave it to her. Gaenor introduces Solomon (as Sam) to her family, who are polite but suspicious of his intentions. Knowing his own family will never accept him being with a gentile woman, Solomon hides the relationship at home.

Burdened by this secret, Solomon begins to struggle with his faith and feels distant from his family. After he and Gaenor are first intimate, Solomon guesses that she is not a virgin. She reveals that she was once engaged to a man, but they broke up after he was severely injured in a mining accident. Gaenor wants to meet Solomon's family, but he claims that his mother is ill and his father is away.

Gaenor's brother, Crad, invites Solomon for a drink with his friends and teases him about being a peddler. Before going to see Gaenor, Solomon always hides his tzitzit in a wall, but this time he is unable to find it. Gaenor becomes frustrated with Solomon's unwillingness to introduce her to his family and tells him she feels like she means nothing to him.

One day in chapel, a fellow worshipper named Noah Jones accuses Gaenor of being pregnant after "fornicating with an outsider." When asked by the Minister to confirm or deny the accusation, Gaenor admits to the whole congregation that she is pregnant. The Rees family is expelled from the chapel. Idris tells Gaenor she has to get married or she cannot keep the baby.

When Solomon next visits the Rees home, Bronwen tells him that Gaenor refuses to see him. Solomon hides out near Gaenor's home for a chance to speak with her. He is discovered and beaten by Crad and his friends, who tell him to never come back. Finally learning from Gaenor that she is pregnant, Solomon is stunned, but she declares that it is not his business. Solomon learns that his brother, Benjamin, took his tzitzit. When Benjamin asks him if he does not want to be a Jew anymore, Solomon says that the prayers make everything seem so simple but they are not.

Gaenor tracks down Solomon and confronts him about lying to her about who he is. Solomon explains that his family will not accept her, and he would be cast out for being with her. Solomon also says that he had struggled to accept her. Gaenor tells him that her family has arranged for her to stay with extended family elsewhere until the baby is born, and it will be taken from her. Gaenor and Solomon begin to see each other again secretly and plan to run away together.

Anti-Semitic feelings rise in the valley due to many people's financial struggles. Crad and his friends plan to ransack the shop owned by the Levinsky family. The family decides to hide elsewhere for safety. That same night, Solomon and Gaenor plan to run away. Solomon sneaks out and is devastated to see his family's shop being destroyed. His father Isaac catches up with him and says that if he leaves with Gaenor, he will be dead to the family. Solomon reluctantly returns to his family, who have lost their business after the damage.

Solomon goes to Cardiff to work for his uncle, in order to help his family. He writes letters to Gaenor, but they are intercepted and destroyed by Crad. Gaenor asks Isaac and Solomon's mother, Rezl, where Solomon is, but they refuse to tell her. She tells them she is carrying their grandchild, but they reject the baby.

Gaenor is sent away to have the baby. After learning that she has left, Solomon returns to the valley. He finds Crad, who brutally beats him and refuses to say where Gaenor is living. They fight more, and Crad finally tells him. Solomon leaves to be reunited with her.

Solomon faces harsh conditions and is ill by the time he reaches Gaenor at her aunt's. Gaenor nurses him, but he is fatally ill and it becomes clear that it is too late to save him. He and Gaenor declare their love for each other. By the next morning, he has died. Soon after, Gaenor gives birth to their baby. With her father, Gaenor takes Solomon's body for burial.

== Cast ==
- Ioan Gruffudd as Solomon Levinsky
- Nia Roberts as Gaenor Rees
- Sue Jones-Davies as Gwen Rees
- William Thomas as Idris Rees
- Mark Lewis Jones as Crad Rees
- Maureen Lipman as Rezl Levinsky
- David Horovitch as Isaac Levinsky
- Daniel Kaye as Philip Levinsky
- Bethan Ellis Owen as Bronwen Rees
- Elliott Cantor as Benjamin Levinsky
- Steffan Rhodri as Noah Jones
- Aled Phillips as Beautiful Boy in Church

== Production ==
This was Morrison's first drama feature film, although he had considerable experience with documentaries. In order to convey the complex society of the Welsh valleys in this period, he featured three languages: Welsh, English and Yiddish, and subtitles. He filmed it twice, once with principal dialogue in English and once with it in Welsh. The English-language version includes some scenes in Welsh, and both versions include scenes in Yiddish.

== Awards ==
- Academy Awards 2000
  - Best Foreign Language Film - Nominated
- Cherbourg-Octeville Festival of Irish & British Film
  - Best Film (Paul Morrison) - Nominated
- Emden International Film Festival
  - Emden Film Award (Paul Morrison) - 2nd Place
- Festróia - Tróia International Film Festival
  - Golden Dolphin (Paul Morrison) - Won
- Verona Love Screens Film Festival
  - Best Film (Paul Morrison) - Won

== See also ==
- Cinema of Wales
- List of Welsh films
