= Prospects (TV series) =

British TV series (1986)

- Genre: Comedy drama
- Created by: Alan Janes
- Starring: Gary Olsen; Brian Bovell
- Theme music composer: Ray Dorset
- Country of origin: United Kingdom
- Original language: English
- No. of series: 1
- No. of episodes: 12

Production
- Producer: Greg Smith
- Running time: 50 minutes
- Production company: Euston Films

Original release
- Network: Channel 4
- Release: 19 February – 7 May 1986

Prospects is a British television comedy-drama series written by Alan Janes and originally released on Channel 4 in 1986. The show was created by Euston Films, who were known for producing gritty dramas such as The Sweeney and Minder. Prospects followed the comic exploits of two East End 'geezer' characters, Jimmy 'Pincy' Pince and Billy 'Bill' Pearson, played by Gary Olsen and Brian Bovell respectively, Prospects showcases the pair's trials and tribulations of making a living in London's Isle of Dogs.

Comprising 12 episodes, Prospects was delivered with a comic slant and dealt with many of the major issues affecting British society at the height of the "Thatcherite" '80s including unemployment, crime, poverty, regeneration, social change, and racism.

The theme tune was written and composed by Ray Dorset. Although the vocals were meant to be sung by Roger Daltrey, the producers liked Dorset's demo enough that they asked him to do the vocals.

The show featured actors such as Ken Jones (Porridge) and Billy Hartman (Emmerdale).

Prospects gained a cult following and, rating-wise, it performed well above expectations for Channel 4. In 1986, Channel 4 received a large subsidy from the rival commercial network ITV in exchange for the right to sell airtime; this gave ITV significant input into the management of the station. The success of Prospects and the fact that it was produced by a subsidiary of the ITV network's largest station Thames Television meant it was moved to a 9 pm prime-time repeat slot on ITV in the Spring/Summer of 1987. This fueled rumours that the network wanted to develop Prospects into a long-running comedy-drama series, but ITV declined the opportunity to develop it beyond the original first 12-episode series.

== Cast ==
- Gary Olsen as Pincy
- Brian Bovell as Billy
- Peter Lovstrom as Mickey Smith
- Chrissie Cotterill as Mona
- Ben Howard as Halforth
- Mike Savage as Del
- Treva Etienne as Horace
- Eddie Tagoe as Stretch
- Nigel Davenport as The Governor
- John Benfield as Kev
- Peter Bayliss as Mr Frobisher
- Eve Bland as Maude
- John Forgeham as Jock
- Billy Hartman as Mr Innes
- John Hallam as Tubby Rawlinson
- Tony Haygarth as Alf
- Bernard Hepton as Hymie Peters
- Hazel O'Connor as Bev Reid
- Malcolm Tierney as Ralph Finchley
- Kate Williams as Bess
- Ken Jones as Mr Lambert
- Glen Murphy as Ron
- Ken Campbell as George
- Paul Mari as Slimey Keith

== Episodes ==
No.	Title	Director	Original release date
1	"The P to S Day"	John Crome	19 February 1986
Billy and Pincy set up a dating agency and burglar alarm company but as always, they seem to spend their time getting out of scrapes.
2	"Partners in Brine"	John Crome	26 February 1986
Pincy has big dreams of setting up a marina and theme park in the Isle of Dogs, but has a problems with money.
3	"Uncle Harry's System"	Ian Tonyton	5 March 1986
Pincy, despite Billy's cynicism, believes he's discovered a guaranteed greyhound betting system. However, they end up in very hot water both with 'Uncle Harry's' system and losing £500 they were minding for local villain 'Stretch'.
4	"Dirty Weekend"	Ian Tonyton	12 March 1986
Billy, Pincy and their girlfriends embark on an ill-fated camping holiday.
5	"Rodent Engineers"	Peter Ellis	19 March 1986
Billy and Pincy set up a pest control business and claim to eliminate an epidemic of 'hyper mice' that have infested the Isle of Dogs.
6	"Standing On Your Own One Foot"	Peter Ellis	19 March 1986
Billy and Pincy move to a new flat. However, it proves an unhappy move after they have a run-in with the area's racist local councillor and his cronies.
7	"Subterranean Pig Sick Blues"	John Crome	2 April 1986
Pincy thinks he can pull off the 'perfect' bank robbery, whilst also launching a scam involving dirty magazines, but things don't quite go as planned.
8	"Frying Tonight"	John Crome	9 April 1986
Billy and Pincy get a job at their local chip shop. However, things spiral out of control when they give marriage guidance advice to the owner George.
9	"Four Men in a Boat"	Bernard Rose	16 April 1986
Billy and Pincy get hired to work as waiters on a wedding boat.
10	"Follow the Yellow Brick Lane"	Bernard Rose	23 April 1986
Billy falls in love with Bev (Hazel O'Connor) a headstrong singer dreaming of becoming a pop star.
11	"Running all the Way - Part 1"	James Hill	20 April 1986
A police 'fit up' sees Billy and Pincy get sent to prison for a crime they didn't commit, disliking the prison life, they escape.
12	"Running all the Way - Part 2"	James Hill	7 May 1986
Billy and Pincy find life hard on the run and start work for 'Tubby' a local gangster who has a feud with 'Stretch' another gangster who was last seen in episode 7. They realise that serving time in prison may have been more ideal than a choosing a life on the run.

== DVD release ==
All 12 episodes were given an official Region 2 DVD release by Network on 25 March 2013.
