= Rosie Rowell =

British actress

- Born: 29 April 1965 (age 61); England
- Occupation: Actress
- Spouse: Rob Spendlove (Since 1995)

Rosie Rowell (born 29 April 1965) is a British actress. She is known for her roles as Eileen Callan in Family Affairs (2002–2005) and Donna Tucker in Soldier Soldier (1991–1995). She also appeared in series such as The Bill, Casualty and Where the Heart Is.

== Early life ==
Rowell grew up on the Byker Estate in Newcastle. She attended Heaton Manor School. Her parents split up when she was young, and at 16, she left home for London, living in squats while studying at the Royal Central School of Speech and Drama.

== Filmography ==
- Dispatches: Britain's Secret Slaves (2010) Narrator
- Dispatches: Undercover Social Worker (2010) Narrator
- The Bill (2008) Fiona Marlowe
- Casualty (2008, 2009) Julie Chantrey
- Dispatches: Undercover Mosque (2007) Narrator
- Doctors (2006) Jeannie Watts
- Family Affairs (2002–2005) Eileen Callan
- Where the Heart Is (2002) Evelyn Parrish
- Dalziel and Pascoe: "Walls of Silence" (2001) Sandra Pallister
- Gabriel & Me (2001) Mam
- Where There's Smoke (2001) Lucy
- Kid in the Corner (1999) Gillian Joyce
- Gold (1997) Maggie
- Kiss and Tell (1996) Jude Sawyer
- Soldier Soldier (1991–1995) Donna Tucker
- Come Snow, Come Blow (1993)
- South of the Border (1988–1990) Finn Gallagher
