= Looking for Langston =

1989 film directed by Isaac Julien

- UK theatrical release poster
- Directed by: Isaac Julien
- Written by: Isaac Julien
- Produced by: Nadine Marsh-Edwards
- Starring: Ben Ellison; Matthew Baidoo; Akim Mogaji; John Wilson; Dencil Williams; Guy Burgess; James Dublin; Harry Donaldson; Jimmy Somerville; Langston Hughes
- Cinematography: Nina Kellgren
- Music by: Wayson Jones; Trevor Mathison; Peter Spencer
- Production companies: Sankofa Film & Video Productions
- Distributed by: British Film Institute
- Release date: February 1989; (Berlin)
- Running time: 42 minutes
- Language: English

Looking for Langston is a 1989 British black-and-white film, directed by Isaac Julien and produced by Sankofa Film & Video Productions. It combines authentic archival newsreel footage of Harlem in the 1920s with scripted scenes to produce a non-linear impressionistic storyline celebrating black gay identity and desire during the artistic and cultural period known as the Harlem Renaissance in New York. The film has a runtime of about 42 minutes.

== Critical synopsis ==
Opening the film is a voice-over of the original radio broadcast made in tribute to Langston Hughes upon his death in 1967 as the scene of his funeral is recreated and reinterpreted. Interspersed among such images as shifting time periods that seamlessly flow from past to present, black men dancing together within a revisionist version of the Cotton Club, or a speakeasy, and dream sequences, are brief narrative extracts from the poetic works of Hughes alongside those of Richard Bruce Nugent, James Baldwin, and Essex Hemphill. Also shown are the controversial images of black men by the photographer Robert Mapplethorpe.

The film is not a biography of Langston Hughes. It is a memoriam to Hughes and the Harlem Renaissance as reconstructed from a black gay perspective. Moreover, it purports to be a meditation on the black gay experience within a historical context built around the homophobia, oppression and denial faced by men of African descent within black communities alongside "allusions and political commentary on white racism."

Hughes is presented as an icon and cultural metaphor for black gay men who were confronted with being ostracized if they did not conform to black bourgeoisie standards whose overriding goal concerned fuller social integration. Contested are the ways the black male and his sexuality have been represented in the modern Western world and how existing notions of race and gender figure within American and African-American culture.

Throughout this process, the identity of Hughes as a black gay man is reclaimed and no longer denied, a process paralleled in the ever-growing academic studies of Hughes today. Moreover adding to the historic and cinematic importance of the film in gay cinema, Looking for Langston continues to be one of very few films showing intra-racial affection between black gay men as revealed in the love story between the two leading black protagonists, with Ben Ellison as Langston Hughes and Matthew Baidoo as Beauty.

Upon the first release of Looking for Langston in the United States in 1990, the estate of Langston Hughes initially attempted to have the film censored because of copyright violations: permission allegedly had not been obtained by the filmmakers permitting them to use the poetry of Hughes in the film. During subsequent screenings of Looking for Langston, the sound was repeatedly turned down when the work of Hughes was read.

Despite allegations of censorship from critics at the time of the U.S. premiere of the film, the estate had allowed many of Hughes' poems to appear in gay anthologies in the print media and continues to do so. Today it falls under the auspices of the British Film Institute as part of its national "Black World" initiative celebrating black creativity in film.

== Cast ==
- Ben Ellison as Alex
- Matthew Baidoo as Beauty
- Akim Mogaji as James
- John Wilson as Gary
- Dencil Williams as Marcus
- Guy Burgess as Dean
- James Dublin as Carlos
- Harry Donaldson as Leatherboy
- Jimmy Somerville as Angel
- Stuart Hall as British voice (voice)
- Langston Hughes as himself (archive footage)

== Awards ==
Teddy Award for Best Short Film at the 1989 Berlin International Film Festival. To celebrate the 30th anniversary of the Teddy Awards, the film was selected to be shown at the 66th Berlin International Film Festival in February 2016.

== See also ==
- African-American culture and sexual orientation
