= Nadine Marsh-Edwards =

British film producer

- Born: United Kingdom
- Education: Goldsmiths College
- Occupation: Film producer
- Years active: 1983–present
- Known for: Cofounder of Sankofa Collective; producer of Bhaji on the Beach, Been So Long, Riches
- Awards: Disney+ Contribution to the Medium Award (2022)

Nadine Marsh-Edwards is a British film producer. She has been described as "a pivotal force in developing a black British cinema".

== Life ==
Marsh-Edwards graduated from Goldsmiths College before cofounding the Sankofa Film and Video Collective with Isaac Julien, Maureen Blackwood, Martina Attille, and Robert Crusz in 1983. She produced films made by several others in the collective before moving to a more commercial success with Gurinder Chadha's 1994 film Bhaji on the Beach.

In 2010, Marsh-Edwards founded the production company Greenacre Films with Amanda Jenks. It became a division of Wall to Wall Media in 2012. The company produced the 2018 Netflix original film Been So Long. In 2019 they announced a first-look TV deal with Banijay. In 2020, they were announced as producers of Unsaid Stories, a four-part series of short dramas examining racial inequality for ITV. In 2021, Greenacre entered into a partnership to help produce a biopic by Frances-Anne Solomon about the life of Claudia Jones. In 2021, a collaboration was announced between Greenacre Films and Akala, for a BBC3 documentary based on Akala's book Natives: Race and Class in the Ruins of Empire.

In 2021 ITV and Amazon Prime commissioned Greenacre to produce a six-part drama, Riches, written by Abby Ajayi.

In 2022 Women in Film & Television presented Nadine with The Disney + Contribution to the Medium Award.

== Filmography ==
- (as director) A Women's Place, 1983.
- (as assistant editor) Majdhar, dir. by Ahmed Alauddin Jamal, 1984.
- (as editor) Territories, dir. by Isaac Julien, 1986.
- (as production manager and editor)The Passion of Remembrance, dir. by Isaac Julien, 1986.
- (as producer) Perfect Image?, dir. by Maureen Blackwood, 1988
- (as production manager) Dreaming Rivers, dir by Martina Attille, 1988
- (as producer and casting) Looking for Langston, dir. by Isaac Julien, 1989
- (as producer) A Nice Arrangement, dir. by Gurinder Chadha, 1991
- (as producer) Public Enemy/Private Friends, dir. by Danny Thompson, 1992
- (as producer) Young Soul Rebels, dir. by Isaac Julien, 1992
- (as producer) A Family Called Abrew, dir. by Maureen Blackwood, 1992
- (as executive producer) Flight of the Swan, dir. by Ngozi Onwurah, 1992
- (as executive producer) Home away from Home, dir. by Maureen Blackwood, 1993
- (as producer) The Posse – Armed and Dangerous, dir. by Liddy Oldroyd, 1993
- (as producer) Bhaji on the Beach, dir. by Gurinder Chadha, 1994.
- (as executive producer) Fathers, Sons, and Unholy Ghosts, dir. by Danny Thompson, 1994
- (as a partner in Xencat Productions) Jump the Gun, dir. by Les Blair, 1997.
- (as executive producer) Lucky Day, dir. by Brian Tilley, 1999
- (As executive producer) Husk, dir. by Jeremy Handler, 1999
- (as executive producer) Portrait of a Young Man Drowning, dir. by Teboho Mahlatsi, 1999
- (as executive producer) Nasty Neighbours, dir. by Debbie Isett, 1999
- (as co-producer) Hijack Stories, dir. by Oliver Schmitz, 2000
- (as executive producer) he Grey Man, dir. by Declan O'Dwyer, 2007
- (as development executive) An Englishman in New York, dir. by Richard Laxton, 2009
- (as producer) Been So Long, dir. by Tinge Krishnan, 2018.
- (as executive producer) Unsaid Stories, dir. by Koby Adom, Francis Annan, Ethosheia Hylton, Alrick Riley, 2020
