= Jim Pines =

American-born film historian (c.1946/1947–2023)

- Born: c. 1946/1947; Boston, Massachusetts, United States
- Died: 2023, aged 77; England
- Occupation(s): Film historian, writer and filmmaker
- Notable work: Blacks in Films (1975)

Jim Pines (c. 1946/1947 – 2023) was an American-born film historian, author and filmmaker. He published widely in journals, including Screen, and wrote the books Blacks in Films (1975), Questions of Third Cinema (1990, with Paul Willemen), Reggae: Deep Roots Music with Howard Johnson, and Doing the Right Thing: The Spike Lee Phenomenon (2010).

== Biography ==
Pines was born in the United States in Boston, Massachusetts, but spent his working life in London, England. He worked for the British Film Institute's Education Department and was a film historian specialising in Black cinema. In June 1971, he launched at the National Film Theatre a season of "Blacks in Films – including screenings of such movies as No Way Out (1950), Sapphire (1959), and Agnès Varda's The Black Panthers – some of which he had shown, while living in Notting Hill, at the Metro Youth Club in St Luke's Road, where the reactions of the predominantly black members underlined for him the need to fill the gap left by the mass media containing very little with which they could identify. He was based during his career at the University of Westminster but also worked with students from Goldsmiths College and St Martin's School of Art.

He published widely in many journals such as Screen and wrote the books Blacks in Films in 1975, Questions of Third Cinema in 1990 with Paul Willemen, and Reggae: Deep Roots Music (1982, with Howard Johnson). In 2010, Pines published Doing the Right Thing: The Spike Lee Phenomenon (BlackAmber Inspirations).

Pines was also a filmmaker, and in 1977, he directed the documentary Breaking the Boundaries for the Commission for Racial Equality.

He was often interviewed on television and used as a commentator on Black cinema, notably in Isaac Julien’s 1992 Black and White in Colour: Television, Memory, Race, 1968–92.

Pines died aged 77 in 2023.

== Books ==
- Blacks in Film, Studio Vista, 1975, ISBN 978-0289703267.
- (with Howard Johnson) Reggae: Deep Roots Music, London: Proteus Books. 1982, ISBN 978-0-86276-117-2.
- (with Paul Willemen) Questions of Third Cinema., BFI Publishing, 1990, ISBN 978-0851702308.
- (Editor) Black and White in Colour: Black People in British Television Since 1936, BFI Publishing, 1992, ISBN 978-0851703282.
- Doing the Right Thing: The Spike Lee Phenomenon, London: BlackAmber Inspirations/Arcadia Books, 2010, ISBN 9781906413415.
