= Martina Attille =

British filmmaker (born 1959)

- Born: 1959 (age 66–67); Castries, Saint Lucia
- Other name: Judah Attille
- Education: Goldsmiths, University of London
- Occupations: Filmmaker and artist
- Known for: Founding member of Sankofa Film and Video Collective

Martina Attille, also known as Judah Attille (born 1959), is a British filmmaker and contemporary artist. In 1983, she was a founding member of Sankofa Film and Video Collective, together with Isaac Julien, Maureen Blackwood, Nadine Marsh-Edwards and Robert Crusz, an initiative "dedicated to developing an independent black film culture in the areas of production, exhibition and audience". Attille wrote and directed Dreaming Rivers, a 1988 film that "illustrates the spirit of modern families touched by the experience of migration", and which was an award winner at the Mannheim Film Festival.

== Biography ==
Martina Attille was born in Castries, Saint Lucia, in the eastern Caribbean, in 1959, and has lived in London, England, since 1961.

She studied at Goldsmiths, University of London, where she produced her first film, By Any Other Name, in 1983, also the year in which year she graduated. She went on to begin a career in the media industry that included working on three programmes for Visions, a Channel Four documentary series on world cinema. She played a key part in the Sankofa Film and Video Collective (1983–1988), all of whose founding members were graduated of art colleges in London. Her writer/director debut, Dreaming Rivers, was a seminal work for Sankofa, with a cast that included Corinne Skinner Carter, Angela Wynter, Nimmy March and Stefan Kalipha, a film score by Shirley Thompson and set design by Sonia Boyce.

In 1990, Attille was a visiting professor in the Visual Art Department of University of California San Diego, and in 1992 she collaborated with Sonia Boyce on the installation I'm Almost Blushing, for the Mary Lou Williams Center at Duke University.

Attille has also been a contributor to such notable publications as The Fact of Blackness: Frantz Fanon and Visual Representation (1996) and Rhapsodies in Black: The Art of the Harlem Renaissance (1997).
