= Frantz Fanon: Black Skin, White Mask =

1997 British film directed by Isaac Julien

- Directed by: Isaac Julien
- Written by: Isaac Julien; Mark Nash
- Produced by: Rodney Wilson; Mark Nash
- Starring: Colin Salmon; Halima Daoud; Noirin Ni Dubhgaill
- Release date: 1997
- Running time: 70 minutes
- Country: United Kingdom
- Language: English

Frantz Fanon: Black Skin, White Mask is a 1997 docudrama film about the life of the martiniquais psychiatrist and civil rights activist Frantz Fanon (1925–1961). The film was directed by Isaac Julien.

== Story ==
The film's plot is interspersed archive footage of Fanon as well as interviews with family members and colleagues of Fanon, including Stuart Hall.

== Cast ==
- Colin Salmon as Frantz Fanon
