= Ed Guerrero =

American historian

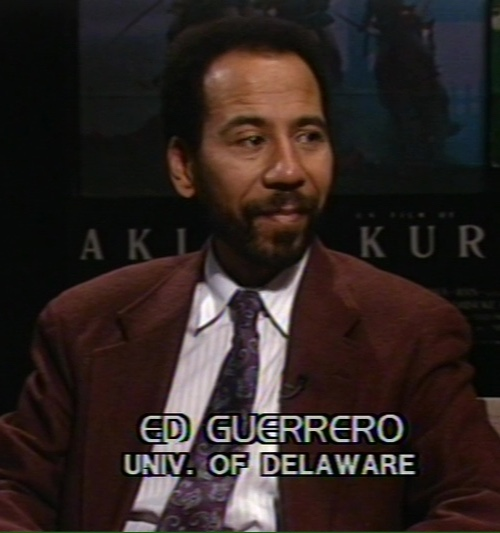
- Guerreo on CUNY TV's Cinema Then, Cinema Now (1993)
- Born: United States
- Education: San Francisco State University; San Francisco Art Institute; University of California, Berkeley
- Occupations: Professor; film historian
- Writing career
- Years active: 1979–present
- Genres: Africana studies; black film; critical theory
- Notable work: Framing Blackness: The African American Image in Film (Culture And The Moving Image)

Ed Guerrero is an American film historian and associate professor of cinema studies and Africana studies in the Department of Social and Cultural Analysis at New York University Tisch School of the Arts. His writings explore black cinema, culture, and critical discourse. He has written extensively on black cinema, its movies, politics and culture for anthologies and journals such as Sight & Sound, FilmQuarterly, Cineaste, Journal of Popular Film & Television, and Discourse. Guerrero has served on editorial and professional boards including The Library of Congress' National Film Preservation Board.

== Education and career ==
In 1972, Guerrero earned both a Bachelor of Arts degree in English Literature from San Francisco State University and a Master of Fine Arts degree in Filmmaking & Aesthetics from San Francisco Art Institute. He received a Doctor of Philosophy degree in Ethnic Studies, University of California, Berkeley in 1989. He was valedictorian.

He has served on the National Film Preservation Board since 1988.

== Works ==
=== Exhibitions ===
- 1998: "Paul Robeson: Star of Stage and Screen", curated for the Rutgers Paul Robeson Centennial Project, retrospective at the UCLA Film & Television Archives (with Charles Musser, Mark Reid).
- 1999: "Borderlines: Paul Robeson and Film", curated for MoMA (with Charles Musser).

=== Filmography ===
- Director (1979). Angela Davis: Walls into Bridges (documentary). PBS.

=== Bibliography ===
Books

- Do the Right Thing. London: British Film Institute, Modern Classics. 2001. ISBN 9781838719883.
- Framing Blackness: The African American Image in Film (Culture And The Moving Image). Philadelphia: Temple University Press 1993. doi:10.2307/j.ctvrdf2mb. ISBN 1566391253.

Essays

- "The Slavery Motif in Recent Popular Cinema". Jump Cut: A Review of Contemporary Media. February 1988.
- Guerrero, Edward (1990). "Tracking "The Look" in the Novels of Toni Morrison". Black American Literature Forum. 24 (4). African American Review: St. Louis University. Women Writers Issue. Winter, 1990: 761–773. doi:10.2307/3041801. JSTOR 3041801.
- Guerrero, Ed (1991). "Black Film: Mo' Better in the '90s". Black Camera. 6 (1). Indiana University Press: 2–3. JSTOR 27761425.
- Guerrero, Edward (1991). "Negotiations of Ideology, Manhood, and Family in Billy Woodberry's Bless Their Little Hearts". Black American Literature Forum. 25 (2): 315–322. doi:10.2307/3041689. JSTOR 3041689.
- "The Black Image in Protective Custody: Hollywood's Biracial Buddy Films of the Eighties". Black American Cinema. Manthia Diawara ed. Routledge 1993. ISBN 9780203873304.
- Guerrero, Ed (1995). "The Black Man on Our Screens and the Empty Space in Representation". Callaloo. 18 (2). Johns Hopkins University Press Spring 1995: 395–400. doi:10.1353/cal.1995.0054. S2CID 162202542.
- "Black Stars in Exile: Paul Robeson, O.J. Simpson, and Othello". Paul Robeson: Artist and Citizen. Jeffrey C. Stewart ed. New Brunswick: Rutgers University Press, 1998.
- "Circus of Dreams & Lies: The Black Film Wave at Middle Age". The New American Cinema. Jon Lewis ed. Durham, Duke University Press 1998. 1998. ISBN 9780822321156.
- "Be Black And Buy". Sight & Sound. December 2000. pp. 33–37. Archived from the original on May 17, 2022.
- "Black Violence as Cinema: From Cheap Thrills to Historical Agonies". Violence and American Cinema. J. David Slocum ed. New York: Routledge, "AFI Film Series" 2001.
- "POV. "Point of View: Watching Wattstax". American Documentary Inc. (blog). PBS. January 17, 2004.
- "Bamboozled: In the Mirror of Abjection". Contemporary Black American Cinema : Race, Gender and Sexuality at the Movies. Mia Mask ed. New York: Routledge, "AFI Film Series" 2008. ISBN 9780203118146.
- "Spike Lee and the Fever in the Racial Jungle". The Spike Lee Reader. Paula Massood Ed. Temple University Press 2008. 2007. ISBN 9781592134847.
- Guerrero, Ed (2011). "The Rise and Fall of Blaxploitation". The Wiley-Blackwell History of American Film. doi:10.1002/9780470671153.wbhaf063. ISBN 9781405179843.
- "Race & Ethnicity : The Spectacle of Black Violence as Cinema". Cinematic Sociology : Social Life in Film. Jean-Anne Sutherland, Kathryn Feltey, eds. Thousand Oaks, Calif: Sage Publications. 2013. ISBN 978-1412992848. OCLC 782128041.

== In media ==
- Baadasssss Cinema: A Bold Look at 70's Blaxploitation Films (commentary).
- In conversation with fellow international film scholars Ruth Ben-Ghiat and Shelleen Greene, and African-American, Afro-Latino and Afro-Italian actors in Blaxploitalian 100 Years of Blackness in Italian Cinema (2016).
- Blaxploitation to Hip Hop, in which hip-hop artists "discuss the influence of blaxploitation films to the genre." (commentary)
- In discussion with filmmakers and historians about C.S.A.: The Confederate States of America in Kevin Willmott's in 'C.S.A.' Roundtable.'
- Infiltrating Hollywood: The Rise and Fall of the Spook Who Sat by the Door (commentary)
- Pam Grier Super Foxy, in which "artists describe the influence Pam Grier and her films have left in their music, art, and discuss her impact on culture in general." (commentary)
- Through a Lens Darkly: Black Photographers and the Emergence of a People, a film that "explores how African American communities have used the camera as a tool for social change from the invention of photography to the present." (commentary)

== Recognition ==
- 1979 Rockefeller Production/Post-Production Grant, PBS
- 1988 U.C. Santa Barbara Dissertation Fellowship
- 1993-1994 Rockefeller Fellowship Program, in residence at University of Pennsylvania
- 1994 Honorable Mention, Theatre Library Association Award: Ed Guerrero. Framing Blackness: The African American Image in Film. Temple University Press, 1993.
- 1997 National Film Preservation Board appointment to the Society for Cinema Studies
- US Department of State "Speaker Specialist" Grants: Serbia-Montenegro; Swaziland, S.A.; Norway & Denmark; Cape Town, S.A.

== Cited in ==
- Baker, Aaron (2003). Contesting Identities: Sports in American Film. United States, University of Illinois Press. ISBN 9780252028168.
- Cashmore, Ellis (2012). Beyond Black: Celebrity and Race in Obama's America. Bloomsbury Publishing Plc. doi:10.5040/9781780931500. ISBN 9781780931500.
- Dyson, Omari L.; Judson, L. Jeffries, Ph.D; Brooks, Kevin L. (2020). African American Culture: An Encyclopedia of People, Traditions, and Customs [3 Volumes]. ABC-CLIO. ISBN 978-1440862441.
- Entman, Robert M.; Rojecki, Andrew (February 15, 2010). The Black Image in the White Mind: Media and Race in America. United Kingdom: University of Chicago Press. ISBN 9780226210773.
- Gates, Philippa (March 8, 2019). Criminalization/Assimilation: Chinese/Americans and Chinatowns in Classical Hollywood Film. Rutgers University Press. ISBN 9780813589435.
- Hayward, Susan (2017). Cinema Studies: The Key Concepts. Routledge Key Guides 5th ed. Routledge. ISBN 978-1138665774.
- Harris, Travis (2017). "Vulgar Voice". Journal of Hip Hop Studies. 4 (1). Daniel White Hodge ed. VCU Scholars Compass. ISSN 2331-5563.
- Musser, Charles; Gaines, Jane Marie; Bowser, Pearl (March 28, 2016). Oscar Micheaux and His Circle: African-American Filmmaking and Race Cinema of the Silent Era. United States: Indiana University Press. ISBN 978-0253021557.
- Nurse, Angela; Winge, Theresa M. (September 2020). Reinhard, CarrieLynn D. (ed.). "Racialized Representations of Black Actresses: Power, Position, and Politics of the Mediated Black Woman". The Popular Culture Studies Journal - A:JPAS Africology: The Journal of Pan African Studies. 8 (2).
- Sexton, Jared (2017). Black Masculinity and the Cinema of Policing. Springer. ISBN 9783319661704.
