= Buddy: The Buddy Holly Story =

Jukebox musical by Alan Janes featuring the music of Buddy Holly

- Music: Buddy Holly and others
- Lyrics: Buddy Holly and others
- Book: Alan Janes
- Productions: 1989 Plymouth Theatre Royal 1989–2002 West End; 1990–1991 Broadway; 1991–2016 UK Tours; 1991–2016 US National Tours; International productions 2007–2008 West End Revival

Buddy: The Buddy Holly Story is a musical in two acts written by Alan Janes, and featuring the music of Buddy Holly. It opened at the Plymouth Theatre Royal in August 1989 before It transferred to the Victoria Palace Theatre on 12 October 1989. An early example of the jukebox musical, Buddy ran in London's West End for over 12 years, playing 5,140 performances. Janes took over the producing of the show himself in 2004, and Buddy has been on tour extensively in the UK since then, having played Broadway, five U.S. National Tours and numerous other productions around the world. The show was nominated for an Olivier Award for Best Musical.

== Development ==
A late-night fan-based conversation in a bar of the Montcalm Hotel in London's West End in 1988, between the theatrical agent Laurie Mansfield, film producer Greg Smith and writer/producer Janes, about rock and roll musician Buddy Holly, led Janes to develop and write Buddy. A year later, supported by Paul McCartney, who owned the copyright to Buddy Holly's music, the show was produced at the Theatre Royal, Plymouth, before its transfer to London's Victoria Palace.

== Productions ==
=== Original production ===
Alan Janes worked with originating director Rob Bettinson, and originating musical director Paul Jury, to present the show for a three/week pre-London engagement in August 1989 at the Theatre Royal, Plymouth, with Paul Hipp as Buddy Holly. The first shows were beset by technical problems, but audiences were enthusiastic.

=== West End productions ===
Buddy transferred to the Victoria Palace Theatre and opened on 12 October 1989. Structural engineers were called to the theatre to make sure the dress circle could take the weight as the structure bounced with the audience as they danced. Buddy transferred to the Novello Theatre, completing a total of 12 and a half years and 5,140 performances at the two theatres. In 2007, Janes brought the show back to the West End at the Duchess Theatre, where it played for a further 634 performances. The 50th Anniversary of Holly's death was celebrated on 3 February with a special performance incorporating several new numbers for that one night. The role of Buddy Holly was equally shared by Dean Elliott and Matthew Wycliffe, who played the role in the 2007 UK touring company. Ritchie Valens was played by Puerto Rican actor Miguel Angel, and J.P. Richardson (The Big Bopper) by actor Lee Ormsby. The 50th Anniversary Tour played concurrently across the UK and starred Oliver Seymour-Marsh and Glen Joseph as Buddy, with Chris Redmond and Dan Graham as the Crickets.

=== UK national tours ===
A UK national tour of Buddy began in June 1991 at the Theatre Royal, Plymouth. This was the first West End production to tour the UK while still playing in the West End; it set a record of 243 weeks of continuous touring, or 4 years 35 weeks on the road. Buddy has continued to tour frequently in the UK.

=== Broadway production/US national tours ===
After a Toronto try-out and 15 previews, the Broadway production, also starring Hipp, opened on November 4, 1990, at the Shubert Theatre, where it ran for 225 performances. Jill Hennessy played a number of roles, including Holly's wife Maria Elena. The show has toured extensively throughout the US, starting with a 53-week tour in November 1991, and with the 5th tour finishing in March 2016.

=== International and touring productions ===
Buddy has been staged in more than 17 countries, including Australia, Austria, Canada, Denmark, Germany, Finland, Iceland, Ireland, Japan, Netherlands, New Zealand, Singapore, South Africa, South Korea, Sweden, UK and USA. Over 25 million people have seen the show worldwide. In Australia, the show's first tour played Sydney's Theatre Royal for 36 weeks before continuing throughout Australia for a further 60 weeks. The second Australian tour in 2009 ran for 39 weeks.

In Germany, the Stage Theatre in Hamburg was built on land next to the river Elbe specifically for Buddy, where the show played for seven years between 1994 and 2001.

== Characters ==
- Buddy Holly
- Hipockets Duncan
- Joe B. Mauldin
- Jerry Allison
- Norman Petty
- Vi Petty
- Tommy Allsup, the 'fourth Cricket'

- Maria Elena Santiago
- The Big Bopper
- Ritchie Valens
- Dion DiMucci
- Niki Sullivan
- Shirley, Peggy Sue, Mary Lou Sokoloff, Maria Elena's Aunt, Clear Lake MC, Decca Producer, Cindy, Murray Deutch, Jack Daw, Performers at the Apollo, DJs, sound engineers, session musicians, Hayriders, etc.

== Synopsis ==
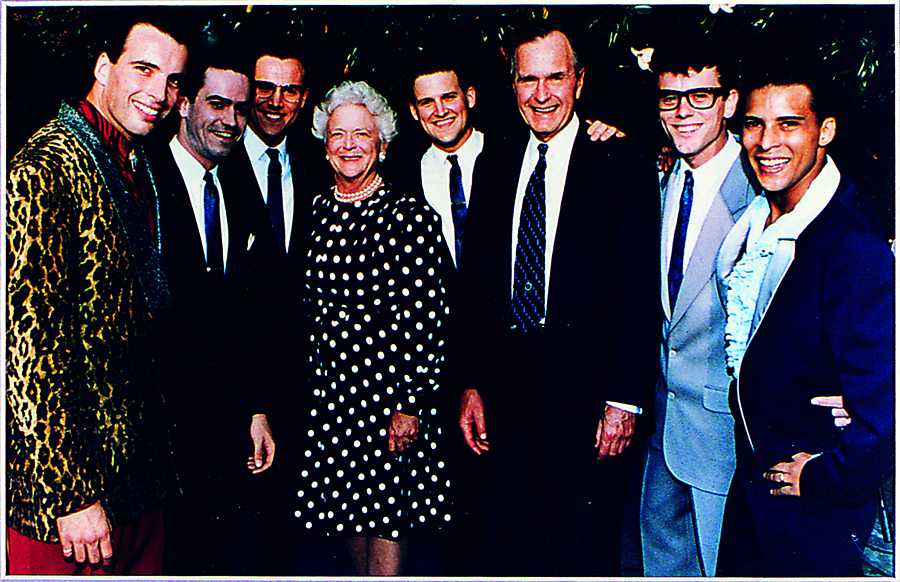
Performance at the White House for President Bush

=== Act I ===
In 1956, with the support of Lubbock, Texas, radio DJ, Hipockets Duncan, Buddy and his two friends form a Country & Western band – Buddy Holly & the Crickets – and begin a career in music. After a difficult start at Decca Records in Nashville, they sign a contract with up-and-coming, innovative record producer Norman Petty, who is based in Clovis, New Mexico. Buddy Holly & the Crickets start to record hits from the studio built in Norman's backyard, among them "That'll Be the Day", which climbed the charts to number one. Buddy Holly & the Crickets became the hottest act in the country and began a national tour.

Buddy and his band go to New York where they perform at the Apollo Theater in New York City, making history as the first white band to perform there.

=== Act II ===
While recording in New York, Buddy proposes to Maria Elena Santiago, the Puerto Rican receptionist of his music publisher after a courtship of all of five hours. Newly married and ambitious, he shifts focus to New York and a rift develops between him and the Crickets. After a declaration of home truths during a recording session, the band split and Buddy unexpectedly finds himself having to pursue a solo career.

Buddy joins The Winter Dance Party of 1959, a bus tour through the Midwest quenching the teenage thirst for the "new music called Rock 'n' Roll" The tour is hard work, the weather conditions appalling and the performers are alternating between sleeping in the luggage racks and dropping into hospital to be treated for frostbite.

The story ends on February 3, 1959, after a rocking concert with the "Big Bopper" J.P. Richardson and Ritchie Valens at the Surf Ballroom in Clear Lake, Iowa. Buddy makes the fateful decision to break his promise to his pregnant wife not to fly, as he and the other two headliners board a small plane and take off into the night destined for their next show. During a snow storm, in the dead of night, the plane crashes and spares no survivors.

== Scenes ==
=== Act 1 ===
- Grand Bowl, Lubbock, Texas
- A Lubbock diner
- Decca Recording Studios, Nashville
- KDAV Radio Studio, Lubbock
- NorVaJak Studios, Clovis, New Mexico
- Apollo Theatre, Harlem, New York

=== Act 2 ===
- Music Publisher's Office, New York
- Central Park, New York
- NorVaJak Studios, Clovis
- Buddy & Maria Elena's Apartment, New York
- Backstage Surf Ballroom, Clear Lake, Iowa
- Clear Lake Concert

== Song list ==
=== Act I ===
- "Rose of Texas" (music and lyrics by Paul Jury)
- "Flower of My Heart" (music and lyrics by Paul Jury)
- "Rip It Up (UK version)" (music and lyrics by Robert Blackwell and John Marascalco) /"Ready Teddy (U.S. version)" (music and lyrics by Robert Blackwell and John Marascalco)
- "Changing All Those Changes" (music and lyrics by Buddy Holly)
- "That'll Be The Day" (music and lyrics by Norman Petty, Jerry Allison, and Buddy Holly)
- "Brown Eyed Handsome Man" (music and lyrics by Chuck Berry)
- "Everyday" (music and lyrics by Charles Hardin (Buddy Holly) and Norman Petty)
- "Shout" (UK tour) (music and lyrics by Kelly Isley, Ronald Isley, Rudolph Isley)
- "Good Time (U.S. version)" (music and lyrics by Paul Jury)
- "Party" (music and lyrics by Paul Jury)
- "Not Fade Away" (music and lyrics by Charles Hardin and Norman Petty)
- Peggy Sue (music and lyrics by Norman Petty, Jerry Allison, and Buddy Holly)
- "Words of Love" (music and lyrics by Buddy Holly)

Act II

- "Think It Over" (music and lyrics by Jerry Allison, Norman Petty, and Buddy Holly)
- "True Love Ways" (music and lyrics by Norman Petty and Buddy Holly)
- "Star Spangled Banner"
- "Why Do Fools Fall in Love" (music and lyrics by Frankie Lymon and Morris Levy)
- "Chantilly Lace" (music and lyrics by J. P. Richardson)
- "Maybe Baby" (music and lyrics by Norman Petty and Buddy Holly)
- "Peggy Sue Got Married" (music and lyrics by Buddy Holly)
- "Heartbeat" (music and lyrics by Norman Petty and Bob Montgomery)
- "La Bamba" (traditional, adapted by Ritchie Valens)
- "Raining in My Heart" (music and lyrics by Felice Bryant and Boudleaux Bryant)
- "It Doesn't Matter Anymore" (music and lyrics by Paul Anka)
- "Rave On!" (music and lyrics by Norman Petty and Bill Tilghman)
- "Johnny B. Goode" (music and lyrics by Chuck Berry)
- "Oh, Boy!"

== Cast list ==
Character	Original West End Cast	Broadway
Buddy Holly	Paul Hipp	Paul Hipp
The Big Bopper	Gareth Marks	David Mucci
Ritche Valens	Enzo Squillino Jr.	Philip Anthony
4th Cricket	Billy Geraghty	Ken Triwush
Joe B. Mauldin	David Howarth	Bobby Prochaska
Jerry Allison	David Bardsley	Russ Jolly
Hipockets Duncan	Vincent Marzello	Fred Sanders
Norman Petty	Ron Emslie	Kurt Ziskie
Maria Elena Santiago	Laurence Bouvard	Jill Hennessy
Vi Petty	Lorna Lee	Jo Lynn Burks
Apollo Main Man	Trevor Michael Georges	Demo Cates
Apollo Singer	Shenton Dixon	Jerome Smith, Jr. Sandra Caldwell; Denise Matthews
DJ at Apollo		Don Stitts
Session Musician	Graham Brand	Alvin Crawford
Belmont	Paul Edwards	Kevin Fox
Maria's Aunt	Carmen Gomez	Liliane Stilwell
Dion DiMucci	Adam Henderson	Adam Henderson
Murray Deutch	Douglas LeLand	Steve Steiner
DJ Clear Lake	Bo Light	
Stage Manager		Peter Mumford
Peggy Sue	Claudia Morris	Melanie Doane
Mary Lou	Megg Nichol	Karen Cole
Decca Engineer		Paul McQuillan
