= BaadAsssss Cinema =

2002 documentary film

- Directed by: Isaac Julien
- Written by: Isaac Julien
- Produced by: Paula Jalfon; Colin MacCabe; Caroline Kaplan
- Starring: Samuel L. Jackson; Pam Grier; Quentin Tarantino
- Edited by: Adam Finch
- Distributed by: Independent Film Channel
- Release date: August 14, 2002
- Running time: 60 minutes
- Country: United States
- Language: English
- Budget: $5,000,000 (estimate)

BaadAsssss Cinema is a 2002 TV documentary film directed by Isaac Julien. Julien looks at the Blaxploitation era of the 1970s in this hour-long documentary.

== Synopsis ==
With archive film clips and interviews, this brief look at a frequently overlooked historical period of filmmaking acts as an introduction rather than a complete record. It features interviews with some of the genre's biggest stars, like Fred Williamson, Pam Grier, and Richard Roundtree. Director Melvin Van Peebles discusses the historical importance of his landmark film Sweet Sweetback's Baadasssss Song. For a perspective contemporary to the documentary, director Quentin Tarantino offers his commentary, and author/critic bell hooks provides scholarly social analysis.

The music of Blaxploitation films is discussed, focusing on Curtis Mayfield's Super Fly and Isaac Hayes' Shaft. Interviews with writer/director Larry Cohen and film historian Armond White are also featured. BaadAsssss Cinema was originally shown on the Independent Film Channel in August 2002 as part of a week-long Blaxploitation film festival.

== Contributors ==
- Larry Cohen
- Ron Finley
- Pam Grier
- Ed Guerrero
- Gloria Hendry
- bell hooks
- Samuel L. Jackson
- Elvis Mitchell
- Afeni Shakur
- Quentin Tarantino
- Melvin Van Peebles
- Armond White
- Fred Williamson
- Isaac Hayes — archive footage
- Roy Innis — archive footage
- Jesse Jackson — archive footage
- Ron O'Neal — archive footage
- Gordon Parks — archive footage

== Films mentioned ==
- Blacula
- Black Belt Jones
- Black Caesar
- Black Gunn
- Coffy
- Foxy Brown
- Jackie Brown
- The Mack
- Original Gangstas
- Shaft
- Super Fly
- Sweet Sweetback's Baadasssss Song

== See also ==
- List of blaxploitation films
