= Sankofa Film and Video Collective =

Black British film collective founded in 1983

Sankofa Film and Video Collective was founded in 1983 by Isaac Julien, Martina Attille, Maureen Blackwood, Nadine Marsh-Edwards and Robert Crusz, who all graduated from various art colleges in London. Supported by the Greater London Council, the British Film Institute and Channel 4, among others, Sankofa was "dedicated to developing an independent black film culture in the areas of production, exhibition and audience". The name and the logo of the collective derive from the Akan word sankofa from Ghana, meaning "return and fetch it", represented figuratively as a bird turning its head back towards its tail, to signify "going back into the past and discovering knowledge that will be of benefit to the people in the future."

== Background ==
The formation of Sankofa Film and Video Collective, like that of the Black Audio Film Collective, was a response to the social unrest in Britain in the 1980s: "Influenced by contemporary debate on post-colonialism and social theorists such as Homi Bhabha and Stuart Hall, both groups centered around investigations of black identity/culture within the British experience and reworked the documentary to articulate new voices in British cinema."

Sankofa's first film, and Isaac Julien's directorial debut in 1983, was Who Killed Colin Roach? - a reflection on the death of a young black man in suspicious circumstances at the entrance of an east London police station.

== Selected filmography ==
- Who Killed Colin Roach? (dir. Isaac Julien, 1983)
- Territories (dir. Isaac Julien, 1984)
- Passion of Remembrance (dir. Maureen Blackwood, Isaac Julien, 1986)
- Dreaming Rivers (dir. Martina Attille, 1988)
- Looking For Langston (dir. Isaac Julien, 1989)
- A Family Called Abrew (dir. Maureen Blackwood, 1992)
- Inbetween (dir. Robert Crusz, 1992)

== See also ==
- Black Audio Film Collective
