= Camden Black Sisters =

Community organization in Camden Town, London

Coordinates: 51.5521°N 0.1406°W

Camden Black Sisters (CBS) is a community organization founded in 1979, which provides support to black women in the London Borough of Camden. It was especially noteworthy as a site of community activism in the 1980s.

== History ==
Lee Kane and Yvonne Joseph founded Camden Black Sisters during a 1979 conference of the Organisation of Women of Asian and African Descent. Another cofounder was Beryl Gilroy.

The filmmaker Maureen Blackwood was a young member of the Camden Black Sisters, and used stories of older members in her 1986 film The Passion of Remembrance. Sokari Ekine was another member.

The group in based in Falkland Road, Camden. It provides a library for black women to read about black history, rooms for community groups to meet, and a venue for performing workshops, conferences and seminars. It has published a newsletter, Black Sista: A Camden Black Sisters Newsletter for Members.
