= Alan Janes =

English TV, film, radio and theatre writer and producer

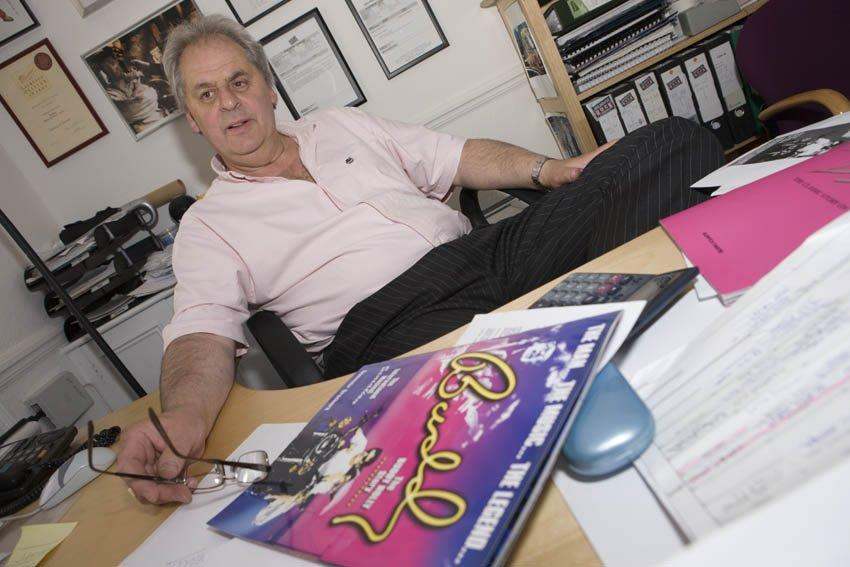
- Born: May 16, 1951 (age 75); England
- Occupations: Writer, producer
- Known for: Musical theatre

Alan Janes (born 16 May 1951) is an English writer and producer who has worked in TV, film, radio and theatre. His musical Buddy – The Buddy Holly Story (widely credited with being the first of the so-called 'jukebox musicals'), ran for over 14 years and almost 6,000 performances in London's West End, and has been on tour in the UK for 17 years. Buddy has also played Broadway, five US national tours, eight years in Germany, three years in Australia and New Zealand, and other productions around the world, leading to the show being billed as "The World's Most Successful Rock 'n' Roll Musical".

== Career ==
Following his first Z-Cars episode, "Two Wise Monkeys", Janes contributed further episodes to the series, "Bit Of Business", and "Fat Freddy B.A.". He then moved with producer Ron Craddock to write the first episodes of the ground-breaking and hard-hitting hospital drama Angels.

Janes continued to write while working at the BBC Television Script Unit, and contributed many further episodes for Angels. He also wrote original plays and classic series adaptations for BBC Radio, including Lady Chatterley's Lover by DH Lawrence, Our Man In Havana and Brighton Rock by Graham Greene, Plain Murder by CS Forester and Lord Raingo by Arnold Bennett.

In the latter half of the 1970s, Janes joined the writing team for the soap opera Emmerdale, and in 1979 was invited by BBC head of children's programmes Anna Home to work with writer Phil Redmond and producer Colin Cant on the expansion of Grange Hill from its initial run to an 18 episode continuing series. He stayed writing for Grange Hill for a total of four series.

In the early 1980s, Janes devised and wrote the children's series Jockey School for BBC1 and wrote three films under the generic title of Prisoners Of Conscience for BBC2, about Vladimir Bukovsky, William Beausire, and Nelson Mandela.

This period saw Janes write for the TV series Minder and pen a film for David Putnam, Winter Flight, directed by Roy Battersby, and a film adaptation with Jim Henson's Creature Shop of George Orwell's Animal Farm, directed by John Stephenson.

=== Buddy ===
A late-night fan based conversation in a London bar in 1988 with the theatrical agent Laurie Mansfield about the rock 'n' roller Buddy Holly, led Janes to develop and write Buddy - The Buddy Holly Story, which opened at London's Victoria Palace Theatre on 12 October 1989. Referred to as the first of the "jukebox musicals", Buddy ran in London's West End for over 14 years, playing for 5,822 performances.

Janes took over the producing of the show himself in 2004, and Buddy has toured in the UK for 17 years. It has also played on Broadway, five national US tours, Canada, Sweden, South Africa, Japan, New Zealand, Australia, Germany, Holland, Singapore, Finland, Austria and Denmark. Janes was nominated for an Olivier Award for Best Musical, and internationally, Buddy has received 29 nominations and awards.

Janes co-wrote and produced the soul musical 125th Street, which played at the Shaftesbury Theatre during 2002-03. He also co-wrote and produced the hit West End musical Jailhouse Rock (based on the songs of Elvis Presley), at the Piccadilly Theatre during 2004 to 2005.

=== Channel 4 ===
1980-81 saw the planning of Britain's newest channel, Channel 4, and Janes became one of the first of the new breed of independent producers when he was commissioned by Mike Bolland, Commissioning Editor for Entertainment, and Jeremy Isaacs, Chief Executive, to develop, write and produce a new hard hitting comedy/drama reflecting the effects of Thatcher's Britain on young people in the East End of London; it became the 12 episode series Prospects, which was filmed during 1984-85 in London's docklands, aired on Channel 4 in 1986 and repeated on ITV in 1987.

Further producer credits for Janes at Channel 4 included 14 episodes over two series of the sitcom Rude Health starring John Wells and the television films Rotten Apples, It's Only Rock 'n' Roll, The End and Positively Negative.

== Works ==
TV, Film, Radio, Theatre

- 1973 – "Two Wise Monkeys" (Z-Cars – BBC)
- 1974 – "Bit Of Business" (Z-Cars – BBC)
- 1974 – "Nights" (Angels – BBC)
- 1975 – "Accident" (Angels – BBC)
- 1975 – "Decisions" (Angels – BBC)
- 1975 – When The Ticking Stops (Original play – BBC)
- 1977 – Joseph Dreamer (Original play – BBC)
- 1977 – Twice Shy (Original play – BBC)
- 1977 – "Casualties" (Angels – BBC)
- 1978 – "Fat Freddie B.A." (Z Cars – BBC)
- 1979 – Brighton Rock by Graham Greene (six-part dramatisation – BBC)
- 1979 – Grange Hill (four episodes – BBC)
- 1979 – Angels (four episodes – BBC)
- 1979 – Emmerdale (six episodes – ITV)
- 1980 – Lady Chatterley's Lover by DH Lawrence (four part dramatisation – BBC)
- 1980 – Lord Raingo by Arnold Bennett (four-part dramatisation – BBC)
- 1980 – Grange Hill (four episodes – BBC)
- 1980 – Emmerdale (six episodes – ITV)
- 1981 – Our Man In Havana by Graham Greene (four-part dramatisation – BBC)
- 1981 – Plain Murder by CS Forester (three part dramatisation – BBC)
- 1981 – Grange Hill (seven episodes – BBC)
- 1981 – Emmerdale (six episodes – ITV)
- 1981 – Prisoners Of Conscience: Vladimir Bukovsky (film - BBC)
- 1982 – Prisoners Of Conscience: William Beausire (film - BBC)
- 1982 – Prisoners Of Conscience: Nelson Mandela (film - BBC)
- 1982 – Grange Hill (five episodes – BBC)
- 1983 – Jockey School (six episode original series – BBC)
- 1983 – Emmerdale (six episodes – ITV)
- 1984 – Winter Flight (feature film – Enigma/Goldcrest/Film Four)
- 1984 – Minder: "Hypnotising Rita" (Euston Films/ITV)
- 1986 – Prospects: "The P To S Day" (Euston Films for Channel 4/ITV)
- 1986 – Prospects: "Partners In Brine" (Euston Films for Channel 4/ITV)
- 1986 – Prospects: "Uncle Harry's System" (Euston Films for Channel 4/ITV)
- 1986 – Prospects: "Dirty Weekend" (Euston Films for Channel 4/ITV)
- 1986 – Prospects: "Rodent Engineers" (Euston Films for Channel 4/ITV)
- 1986 – Prospects: "Standing On Your Own One Foot" (Euston Films for Channel 4/ITV)
- 1986 – Prospects: "Subterranean Pig Sick Blues" (Euston Films for Channel 4/ITV)
- 1986 – Prospects: "Frying Tonight" (Euston Films for Channel 4/ITV)
- 1986 – Prospects: "Four Men In A Boat" (Euston Films for Channel 4/ITV)
- 1986 – Prospects: "Follow The Yellow Brick Lane" (Euston Films for Channel 4/ITV)
- 1986 – Prospects: "Running All The Way Part One" (Euston Films for Channel 4/ITV)
- 1986 – Prospects: "Running All The Way Part Two" (Euston Films for Channel 4/ITV)
- 1987 – Rude Health (I) – producer (seven episode situation comedy for Channel 4)
- 1988 – Rude Health (II) – producer (seven episode situation comedy for Channel 4)
- 1989 – Rotten Apples – producer (original film for Channel 4)
- 1989 – It's Only Rock 'n' Roll; The End; Positively Negative. Producer (three short films for Channel 4)
- 1989 – Buddy: The Buddy Holly Story (Victoria Palace Theatre)
- 1999 – Animal Farm (adapted from the original novel by George Orwell for Hallmark Films)
- 2002 – 125th Street (co-writer/producer, Shaftesbury Theatre)
- 2004 – Jailhouse Rock The Musical (co-writer/producer, Piccadilly Theatre)
