= Young Soul Rebels =

- British theatrical release poster
- Directed by: Isaac Julien
- Written by: Isaac Julien; Paul Hallam; Derrick Saldaan McClintock
- Produced by: Nadine Marsh-Edwards
- Starring: Valentine Nonyela; Mo Sesay; Dorian Healy; Frances Barber; Sophie Okonedo; Debra Gillett; Jason Durr; Gary McDonald; Eamon Walker
- Cinematography: Nina Kelgren
- Edited by: John Wilson
- Music by: Simon Boswell
- Production companies: British Film Institute; Film Four International; Sankofa Film & Video; La Sept; Kinowelt Filmproduktion; Iberoamericana Films Producción
- Distributed by: British Film Institute (United Kingdom); Les Films de l'Atalante (France); Kinowelt Filmverleih (Germany); Ibero Films Internacional (Spain)
- Release dates: 9 August 1991 (United Kingdom); 6 December 1991 (United States); 8 April 1992 (France); 18 June 1993 (Spain)
- Running time: 105 minutes
- Countries: United Kingdom; France; Germany; Spain
- Language: English
- Budget: £1.3 million
- Box office: £33,246 (UK)

Young Soul Rebels is a 1991 independent coming-of-age thriller film written by Derrick Saldaan McClintock, Isaac Julien and Paul Hallam, and directed by Julien as his narrative feature film debut. An international co-production of the United Kingdom, France, Germany and Spain, the film examines the interaction between youth cultural movements during the late 1970s in the UK — namely skinheads, punks, and soulboys — along with the social, political, and cultural tensions between them.

The film was released in the United Kingdom on 9 August 1991, followed by a North American release on 6 December 1991. The film was the feature film acting debut of Sophie Okonedo and Eamonn Walker.

== Plot ==
The film revolves around various plots. The central story-line is about a murder investigation involving one of the central characters Chris (Valentine Nonyela) and his relationship with his girlfriend Tracy (Sophie Okonedo).

The second narrative involves the relationship between a gay punk Billibud (Jason Durr) and a soulboy Caz (Mo Sesay) and the racism and homophobia they face in both West Indian and white British communities. The film is a love story that can be seen as an allegory for racial and class solidarity, as their love transcends class and race barriers.

Set in London in June 1977, the plot takes place against the background of the Queen's Silver Jubilee. The film begins as buddy movie between two friends, Chris and Caz, who run a pirate radio station from a tower block in Dalston, East London. The film starts with the murder of their friend TJ while cruising for sex in the local park at night. While Caz is distraught by the death of his friend, Chris seems focused on balancing a professional career in commercial radio without selling out. They both want to promote soul music while the prevailing popular music is punk.

The murder and the different paths they diverge on causes tension between buddies Chris and Caz. Chris discovers that he has a tape recording of the murder but fails to hand it in as evidence. He is then pulled in by the police as a suspect because he was in possession of TJ's cassette radio. He tries to call Caz but Caz is busy with his new boyfriend, Billibud, who is a punk that espouses the views of the Socialist Workers Party while wearing (admittedly stolen) Vivienne Westwood designer T-shirts. The character Billiibud gets his name from the fictional character "Billy Budd" from Herman Melville's novel "Billy Budd, Sailor". In this novel Billy Budd is described as "renowned for his good looks and gentle, innocent ways". Similarly, in the film Billibud is known for being good looking. However, in Melville's novel the character is also known for being on the less intelligent and gullible side, as seen for his "inability to perceive ill will in other people" and has an "unpredictable tendency to stutter". In comparison, in the film Billibud is also portrayed as somewhat dimwitted.

Chris and Caz then have a showdown on the roof of the tower block and Chris nearly falls off the roof. He then meets Tracy and she persuades him to send the tape to the police, but not before he has made a copy. They then make love on a rooftop. On the day of the Silver Jubilee celebrations Caz and Billibud go to the street fair, where Billibud is attacked by local skinheads. Caz and Billibud return home and make love. That evening Chris goes to the radio station but Caz is not there and the studio has been vandalised. He starts broadcasting "Funk the Jubilee" but feels is not the same without his partner, Caz. Chris is then attacked by TJ's murderer, who turns out to be someone he and Caz had thought of as a friend. He escapes but cannot find Caz.

A grand reckoning takes place at an open-air disco in the park where TJ was murdered. While Caz and Billibud are MCing, Chris attempts to warn them about the revelations regarding TJ's murderer. A Molotov cocktail is thrown onto the stage and Caz and Billibud begin trying to save the vinyl records. Chris puts on the tape of TJ's murder, but doing so requires going onto the stage. TJ's murderer, a member of the National Front, follows Chris on stage, whereupon he falls to his death in the inferno of his own creation.

The scene is a bitter-sweet microcosm of the racial and sexual tensions of 1970s Britain, with skinheads hassling Chris and Caz, whites making snide remarks about how things have changed since their youth, and blacks stating that they are unable to decide if they hate whites, mixed-race people or "batty boys" most. Yet, despite all of this, youth in the clubs are enjoying the music, drinking, dancing and bonking inter-racially while paying no mind to the gay men around them.

The film ends with the two DJs reconciling their differences while they clean records, which is followed by each of the friends joining the dance together.

== Cast ==
- Valentine Nonyela as Chris
- Mo Sesay as Caz
- Dorian Healy as Ken
- Frances Barber as Ann
- Sophie Okonedo as Tracy
- Jason Durr as Billibud
- Gary McDonald as Davis
- Debra Gillett as Jill
- Eamonn Walker (credited as Eamon Walker) as Carlton
- James Bowers as Sparky
- Billy Braham as Kelly
- Wayne Norman as Bigsy
- Danielle Scillitoe as Trish
- Ray Shell as Jeff Kane
- Nigel Harrison as Cid Man

== Awards ==
The film received the Critics' Prize at the 1991 Cannes Film Festival.

== Soundtrack ==
Official Soundtrack Credits

1. "P. Funk (Wants to Get Funked Up)" by Parliament
2. "Identity" by X-Ray Spex
3. "Rock Creek Park" by The Blackbyrds
4. "Running Away" by Roy Ayers
5. "I Like It" by Players Association
6. "Party Time" by The Heptones
7. "Let's Get It Together" by El Coco
8. "Cocaine" by Sly and The Revolutionaries
9. "Don't Let It Go To Your Head" by Jean Carn
10. "Time Is Moving On" by The Blackbyrds
11. "Say You Will" by Eddie Henderson
12. "Oh Bondage Up Yours!" by X-Ray Spex
13. "One Nation Under A Groove" by Funkadelic
14. "Me and Baby Brother" by War
15. "I'll Play The Fool For You" by Dr. Buzzard's Original Savannah Band
16. "Police & Thieves" by Junior Murvin
17. "You Make Me Feel (Mighty Real)" by Sylvester
18. "Message In Our Music" by The O'Jays
19. "Let The Music Play" by Charles Earland
