= Jonas Kellgren =

British physician

- Born: Jonas Henrik Kellgren; 11 September 1911; Hindhead, Surrey, England
- Died: 22 February 2002 (aged 90); Ulverston, Cumbria, England
- Other name: Jonky / Yonky Kellgren
- Education: UCL Medical School; St George's, University of London
- Spouses: Ruth Rushton (m. 1934; div. 1940) Thelma Reynolds (m. 1942)
- Children: 5; including Nina
- Relatives: Jessica Kellgren-Fozard (granddaughter); James Cyriax (cousin)

Jonas Henrik Kellgren (11 September 1911 – 22 February 2002) was a British physician and the first professor of rheumatology in the United Kingdom at the University of Manchester. He became Vice-Chancellor of the university and dean of the institution's medical school. He was an expert adviser to the World Health Organization and earned a Canada Gairdner International Award for his work.

== Early life and education ==
Kellgren was born in Surrey to father Jonas Henrik "Harry" and mother Vera. His mother was a Russian refugee, and his father was from a Swedish family of doctors. He grew up in London where his father and uncle co-ran a practice on Eaton Square, but it ended up failing and Kellgren's father died of influenza in 1919. Kellgren received financial aid from a "grateful patient" for his education at Bedales School and UCL Medical School. He also studied in Scandinavia on a scholarship and at St George's, University of London alongside his brother Ernst.

== Career ==
Post graduation, Kellgren worked as a researcher for University College Hospital under Thomas Lewis. His work focused on referred pain.

Just as Kellgren received the Belt fellowship, the Second World War broke out. During the war, he became a surgeon at Great Ormond Street Hospital in the children's ward and on Dunkirk survivors at Leavesden Hospital. He then joined the Royal Army Medical Corps as a major stationed with the Allied Armies in Italy and North Africa.

After the war in 1946, Kellgren resumed his pain research and experiments at Wingfield Morris Hospital in Oxford, with a focus on peripheral nerve injuries. He became a physician and director at the Centre for Research in Chronic Rheumatism in Manchester the following year and joined the Arthritis and Rheumatism Council. He worked with John Lawrence, who had conducted research on rheumatism in the mining industry. They established the Mobile Field Survey Unit in 1954.

Kellgren conceptualised nodal osteoarthritis, characterised by nodes on the distal joints on the fingers and other parts of the body, often genetic and found in older women. He also studied gout and ankylosing spondylitis. He discovered the benefits of exercise in cases of the latter, distinguishing it from other forms of arthritis.

Kellgren was appointed professor of rheumatology, the first role in the United Kingdom of its kind, at the University of Manchester in 1953. He was president of the Heberden Society and also lectured at the Royal College of Physicians. He established teaching programmes and postgraduate centres in the region and country. He was made dean of Manchester's new medical school, a position he held from 1968 to 1973. He also served as Vice-Chancellor of the university from 1969 to 1972. He was given the title of emeritus professor upon his retirement in 1976 and remained a medical advisor.

A member of a number of organisations and committees, Kellgren was named an expert advisor to the World Health Organization in 1961 and joined the Manchester Regional Hospital Board in 1965. He sat on the Flowers committee in 1984.

== Personal life ==
Kellgren was married to Ruth Rushton from 1934 until their divorce in 1940. They had a daughter, Judith. He married his second wife, Thelma Reynolds, an American nurse from Amesbury, Massachusetts, in 1942 in St Marylebone. They retired to the South Lakes in Cumbria. They had four daughters: Joanna, Nina, Ingrid, and Lee. He is the grandfather of YouTuber and television personality Jessica Kellgren-Fozard.

== Accolades and legacy ==
Kellgren was awarded a Canada Gairdner International Award in 1961.

The Kellgren Centre for Rheumatology at Manchester Royal Infirmary is named after him. In addition, there are the JH Kellgren laboratories at the university, named as such when they were new in 1996.

Kellgren's radiological criteria for the severity of arthritis remain in use today.
