= Derek (2008 film) =

2008 film

- Directed by: Isaac Julien
- Release date: 19 January 2008 (SFF)
- Running time: 1h 16min
- Country: United Kingdom
- Language: English

Derek is a 2008 British documentary film directed by Isaac Julien. It uses archive footage to depict the life of Derek Jarman.

== Cast ==
- Derek Jarman - Himself (archive footage)
- Tilda Swinton - Narrator (voice)
- Margaret Thatcher - Herself (archive footage)
