= Jessica Kellgren-Fozard =

British YouTuber (born 1989)

- Born: Jessica Kellgren-Hayes; 25 January 1989 (age 37); Camden, London, England
- Education: University of Brighton (BA)
- Spouse: Claudia Fozard (m. 2016)
- Children: 3
- Parents: Derek W. Hayes (father); Lee Kellgren (mother)
- Relatives: Jonas Kellgren (grandfather)

YouTube information
- Channel: Jessica Kellgren-Fozard
- Years active: 2011–present
- Genres: LGBTQ+, disability, history, fashion, and lifestyle
- Subscribers: 1.23 million
- Views: 231 million
- Last updated: 14:35, 26 May 2026 (UTC)
- Website: jessicaoutofthecloset.co.uk

Jessica Kellgren-Fozard (née Kellgren-Hayes; born 1989) is a British YouTuber, television personality and writer. She is known for her videos on disability awareness, LGBT history, and vintage fashion. She began making YouTube videos in 2011 and has since gained over a million subscribers.

== Early life and education ==
Jessica Kellgren-Hayes was born in Camden, London on 25 January 1989, and grew up in Bristol. Her mother, Lee Kellgren, is a dyslexic artist and printmaker, and her father, Derek W. Hayes, is an animator and director. She has one younger brother. She is the granddaughter of Jonas Kellgren (1911–2002), the first professor of rheumatology in the UK at the University of Manchester. She is of Swedish, American, and Russian descent on her mother's side.

Kellgren-Fozard is a Quaker and attended Sidcot School in Winscombe. She finished her secondary school education at Cotham School at the age of 19. She initially pursued a local BTEC diploma in Art and Design. She then studied at the University of Brighton, graduating with a Bachelor of Arts in Film and Screen Studies.

Kellgren-Fozard states that she recognized she was lesbian from a young age and never had to come out to her family.

== Career ==
=== Broadcasting ===
In 2008, Kellgren-Fozard participated in the BBC Three reality television series Britain's Missing Top Model, finishing in third place.

In 2014, she appeared on Brighton-based LatestTV. In 2015, she co-hosted LatestTV's movie review series such as PostFeature and Movie Line and interviewed filmmakers on FilmFest. In 2016, she hosted her own educational entertainment television show called Quintessentially Jessica.

=== YouTube ===
Kellgren-Fozard's videos cover a range of topics including vintage fashion and beauty, disability issues, and LGBT issues and history.

In 2019, she partnered with The School of Life for the YouTube Originals series "The School of..." on the YouTube Premium service, narrated by Alain de Botton where seven popular YouTube creators cover a philosophical topic important to them. Kellgren-Fozard's episode is about the secrets of happiness.

In December 2020, fellow YouTuber Daniel Howell selected Kellgren-Fozard to be featured on YouTube UK's creator campaign The Rise, in which ten established YouTube personalities each highlighted a "rising star" of their choosing.

=== Writing ===
Kellgren-Fozard contributed a chapter to the anthology Owning It: Tales from our Disabled Childhoods alongside the likes of Elle McNicoll and Imani Barbarin. The anthology was published in April 2025 via Faber & Faber.

== Personal life ==
Kellgren-Fozard is deaf, which is caused by her disabilities: hereditary neuropathy with liability to pressure palsy, Ehlers–Danlos syndrome, and postural orthostatic tachycardia syndrome. Her symptoms began appearing when she was a teenager. She is also blind in one eye and experiences memory loss. In a July 2023 video, she revealed that she had been diagnosed with ADHD.

Kellgren-Fozard is a lesbian. She lives in Brighton with her wife, Claudia, who previously worked as a dentist. They married at a Quaker meeting house in Bristol, in September 2016. The couple have three children conceived via IVF: a son (born June 2021) and identical twin daughters (born May 2025).

The couple have also had multiple dogs, including their current dog Tilly. In 2018, Kellgren-Fozard became a sponsor of the charity Hearing Dogs for Deaf People.

== Bibliography ==
- Chapter in Owning It: Tales from our Disabled Childhoods (2025)

== Awards and nominations ==
Kellgren-Fozard was awarded an honorary PhD from the University of Worcester in 2018 after being nominated by students for her work in disability awareness.

Year	Award	Category	Result	Ref.
2019	Diva Awards	Rising Star of the Year	Nominated	
2019	Blogosphere Awards	Vlogger of the Year	Won	
2020	National Diversity Awards	Positive Role Model Award – LGBT	Nominated	
2021	British LGBT Awards	Online Influencer	Won	
2026	Attitude Pride Awards		Won	
