= Tara Parker-Pope =

American writer

Tara Parker-Pope is an American author of general-audience books on health and personal wellness. In April, 2022, she joined the Washington Post as editor of the newly formed wellness department.

Parker-Pope was previously at The New York Times where she was a columnist and author of the "Well" blog. Earlier, Parker-Pope wrote for the Wall Street Journal and the Houston Chronicle.

== Work ==
Her writing style is to mix personal observation with discussions of scientific research. For some, this style is appealing, as when Anne Colby writes in an online blog of the Los Angeles Times, "One of the perks of being a journalist is that it can give professional license to explore subjects of personal interest and to knock on doors closed to most people -- all in the course of doing your job. Author Tara Parker-Pope has made the most of that opportunity with her excellent new book." For others, this approach yields "relationship advice [which] is familiar and commonsensical," even as "married couples will still benefit from this refresher course."

== Personal life ==
Parker-Pope was born in Arizona, and has lived in Japan, Taiwan, Texas and Ohio. She has a college-age daughter and lives on Manhattan's Upper West Side, with her aging pets — Sunshine (cat) and Maddie (dog).

== Selected works ==
- Cigarettes: Anatomy of an Industry from Seed to Smoke. New York: The New Press. 2001. ISBN 978-0-7567-9138-4
- HRT: Everything you need to know to ... Untangle the controversy, understand your option and make your own choices. Rodale, 2007. ISBN 978-1-905744-10-7
- The Hormone Decision. Pocket Books, 2008. ISBN 978-1-4165-6201-6
- For Better (For Worse): The Science of a Good Marriage: Lessons from the Love Lab. Vermilion, 2010. ISBN 978-0-09-192927-5
