= Beyond Fear (film) =

1997 British television film

- Genre: Crime drama
- Written by: Don Shaw
- Directed by: Jenny Wilkes
- Starring: Gina McKee; Sylvester McCoy; Judith Anthony; Kitty McGeever; Sally Rogers; Iain Rogerson; Phil Croft; James Grant; Roger Ennals; Davyd Harries
- Composer: Robert Lockhart
- Country of origin: United Kingdom
- Original language: English

Production
- Executive producers: Stephen Frears; Linda James
- Producer: Jill Green
- Cinematography: Nina Kellgren
- Editor: Budge Tremlett
- Running time: 90 minutes
- Production companies: Red Rooster Film & Television Entertainment

Original release
- Network: Channel 5
- Release: 30 March 1997

Beyond Fear is a British television crime drama film, first broadcast on March 30, 1997, the opening night of Channel 5, that details the kidnap of estate agent Stephanie Slater by convicted murderer Michael Sams.

== Production ==
The drama was adapted from Slater's acclaimed book of the same name by screenwriter Don Shaw, with Jenny Wilkes assigned to direct. Beyond Fear starred Gina McKee as Slater and Sylvester McCoy as Sams, with Judith Anthony, Kitty McGeever, Sally Rogers and Iain Rogerson also appearing in key roles. Slater was heavily involved in the film's production.

== Reception ==
Gerard Gilbert of The Independent gave praise to Beyond Fear, writing: "The undoubted jewel in Channel 5's rather wobbly opening-night crown. This is a fine, unsalacious reconstruction of Slater's brave cat-and-mouse encounter with her captor, and Gina McKee gives a convincing portrayal of a normal young woman in an intolerable situation. Former Doctor Who Sylvester McCoy is gruffly menacing as Sams."

== Broadcast ==
The film recorded a viewing figure of 1.7 million, the most watched programme on the channel that night.

Notably, Beyond Fear has never been released on VHS or DVD, although has previously been repeated on True Entertainment as part of their Best of British season, as well as the Lifetime network in the United States.

== Cast ==
- Gina McKee as Stephanie Slater
- Sylvester McCoy as Michael Sams
- Judith Anthony as Betty Slater
- Kitty McGeever as Jo Fennimore
- Sally Rogers as DS Anne Woolley
- Iain Rogerson as DS Steve McBride
- Phil Croft as Derek Smith
- James Grant as Warren Slater
- Roger Ennals as P.C. Simpson
- Davyd Harries as Det. Supt. Morris
- Bob Mason as Det. Supt. Clarke
- Di Sherlock as Mrs. Dart
- Bruce Alexander as Interrogator #1
- Terence Beesley as Interrogator #2
