= Mark Nash (film historian) =

Curator, film historian and filmmaker

Mark Nash is an independent curator, film historian, and filmmaker with a specialisation in contemporary avant-garde and world cinema. He is a professor at the University of California, Santa Cruz (UCSC), where he founded the Isaac Julien Lab with his partner and long-time collaborator, artist Sir Isaac Julien. He has a PhD from Middlesex University and an MA from Cambridge University.

He is the author of Curating the Moving Image (Duke University Press, 2023) and Screen Theory Culture (Language, Discourse, Society) among other texts. He was co-curator of Red Africa: Things Fall Apart (Calvery 22/Iwalewahaus, 2016), One Sixth of the Earth: Ecologies of Image (ZKM Karlsruhe, 2012), Documenta 11 (2002) and film curator of the Berlin Biennial (2004). He curated Experiments with Truth (Fabric Workshop and Museum, Philadelphia, 2004–5). He is a former editor of Screen and was closely involved with the development of Film Theory and the experimental, independent and workshop film movements in the UK, Europe and the US in the 1970s and 1980s.
