= Isaac Julien =

British artist and film director (born 1960)

Sir Isaac Julien CBE RA
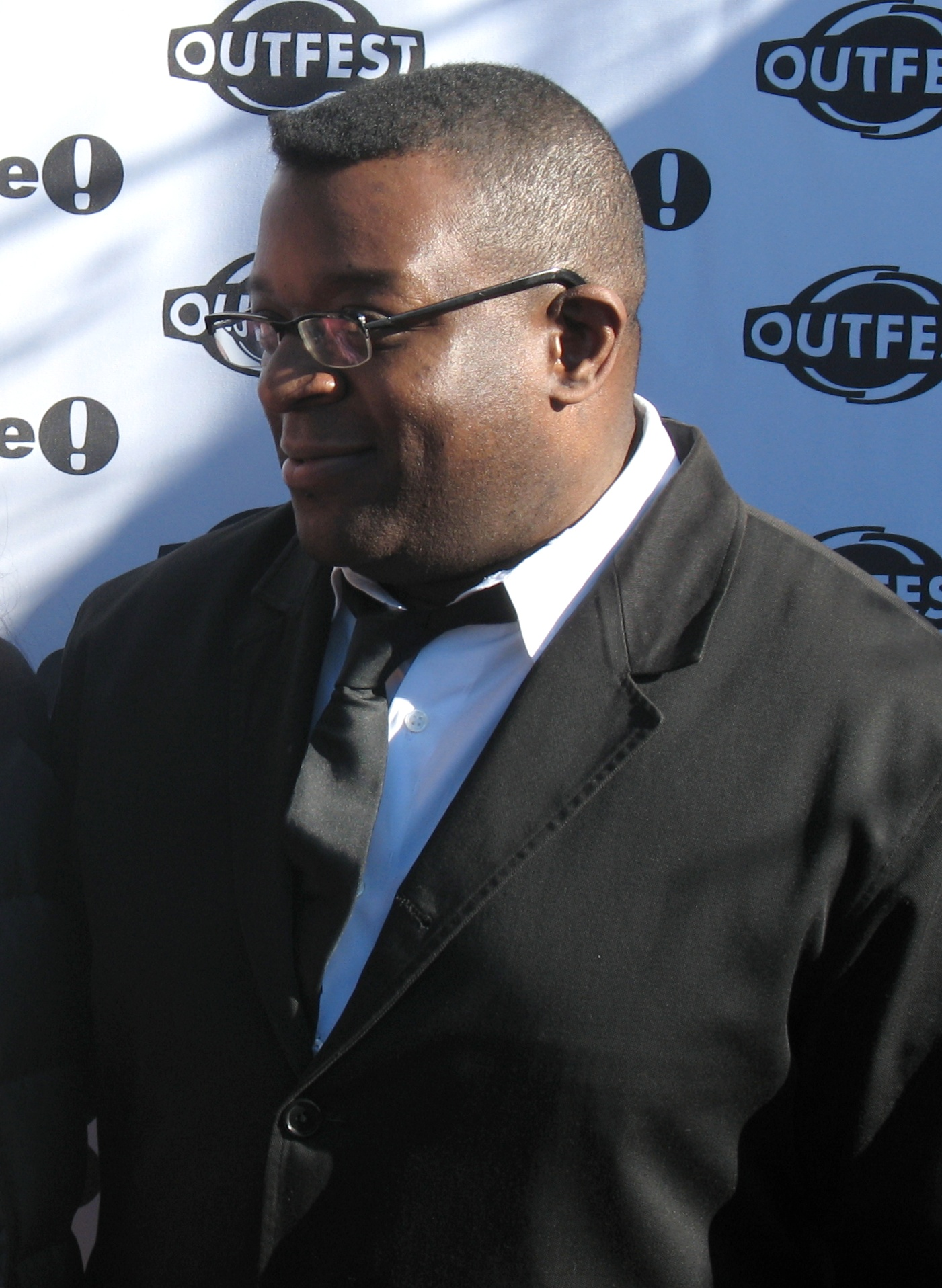
- Born: 21 February 1960 (age 66); London, England
- Education: Saint Martins School of Art (BA)
- Occupations: Installation artist and filmmaker
- Employer(s): University of California, Santa Cruz; Goldsmiths, University of London; Karlsruhe University of Arts and Design
- Known for: Looking for Langston (1989)
- Website: isaacjulien.com

Sir Isaac Julien CBE RA (born 21 February 1960) is a British installation artist, filmmaker, and Distinguished Professor of the Arts at the University of California, Santa Cruz.

== Early life ==
Julien was born in the East End of London, one of the five children of his parents, who had migrated to Britain from St Lucia. He graduated in 1985 from Saint Martin's School of Art, where he studied painting and fine art film. He co-founded Sankofa Film and Video Collective in 1983, and was a founding member of Normal Films in 1991.

== Education ==
In 1980, Julien organized the Sankofa Film and Video Collective with, among others, Martina Attille, Maureen Blackwood, Nadine Marsh-Edwards, which was "dedicated to developing an independent black film culture in the areas of production, exhibition and audience". He received a BA Honours degree in Fine Art Film and Video from Saint Martins School of Art, London (1984), where he worked alongside artists, film-makers and lecturers Malcolm Le Grice, William Raban, Anna Thew, Tina Keane, Vera Neubauer, and co-students, directors and film-makers Adam Finch, Richard Heslop and Sandra Lahire, and completed his postdoctoral studies at Les entrepreneurs de l'audiovisuel européen, Brussels (1989).

== Career ==
Julien achieved prominence in the film world with his 1989 drama-documentary Looking for Langston, gaining a cult following with this poetic exploration of Langston Hughes and the Harlem Renaissance. His following grew when his film Young Soul Rebels won the Semaine de la Critique prize for best film at the Cannes Film Festival in 1991.

One of the objectives of Julien's work is to break down the barriers that exist between different artistic disciplines, drawing from and commenting on film, dance, photography, music, theatre, painting and sculpture, and uniting these to construct a powerfully visual narrative. Thematically, much of his work directly relates to experiences of black and gay identity (he is himself gay), including issues of class, sexuality, and artistic and cultural history.

Julien is a documentary filmmaker, and his work in this genre includes BaadAsssss Cinema, a film on the history and influence of blaxploitation cinema.

In 2014, Julien presented his exhibition Ten Thousand Waves at Fotografiska Stockholm.

In 2023, the Tate Gallery in London held a major retrospective of his work titled What Freedom Is to Me. The exhibition was set to open at the Bonnefantenmuseum in Maastrict in March 2024.

The Pérez Art Museum Miami acquired Julien's Ogun’s Return (Once Again... Statues Never Die) (2022) for the museum collection as part of its PAMM Fund for Black Art in 2024. In this same year, Sir Isaac Julien's films were on view at the Smithsonian National Portrait Gallery, Washington DC, and the Whitney Museum of American Art, New York. The first, a solo presentation and multichannel installation Isaac Julien: Lessons of the Hour—Frederick Douglass, and the latter, the cinematic installation Once Again . . . (Statues Never Die), a commentary on the life and work of Alain Locke, Harlem Renaissance philosopher, in dialogue with Albert C. Barnes about African art, at the 2024 Whitney Biennial.

From April 12 – July 13, 2025, the Fine Arts Museums of San Francisco exhibited Isaac Julien: I Dream a World. The exhibition was the first retrospective of Julien’s work in the United States and included 10 video installations and several films.

=== Collaborations ===
Julien cites cultural theorist and sociologist Stuart Hall as an important influence on his filmmaking. Hall narrates a portion of Looking for Langston. Julien involves Hall in his work once more in the 1996 film Frantz Fanon: Black Skin, White Mask, which tells the story of Frantz Fanon, the theorist and psychiatrist from Martinique. As a member of the Sankofa Film and Video Collective, Julien made The Passion of Remembrance (1986), "which attempts to deal with the difficulties of constructing a documentary history of black political experience by foregrounding questions of chauvinism and homophobia." In 2007, Julien participated in Performa 07 creating his first evening-length production Cast No Shadow in collaboration with Rusell Maliphant.

== Other activities ==
Since 2018, Julien has been a member of the Curatorial Advisory Group at the Zeitz Museum of Contemporary Art Africa. In 2019, he was a member of the jury that selected Arthur Jafa as winner of the Prince Pierre Foundation's International Contemporary Art Prize.

== Recognition ==
Julien was nominated for the Turner Prize in 2001, and in 2003 he won the Grand Jury Prize at the Kunstfilm Biennale in Cologne for his single-screen version of Baltimore.

Julien was appointed Commander of the Order of the British Empire (CBE) in the 2017 Birthday Honours for services to the arts and was knighted in the 2022 Birthday Honours for services to diversity and inclusion in art. He was elected a Royal Academician in 2017.

== Personal life ==
Julien lives and works in London, England, and Santa Cruz, California. He works with his partner Mark Nash.

Julien was a visiting lecturer at Harvard University's Departments of Afro-American and Visual Environmental Studies, and was a visiting seminar leader in the MFA Art Practice programme at the School of Visual Arts, and a visiting professor at the Whitney Independent Study Program in New York City. He was also a research fellow at Goldsmiths College, University of London, and in September 2009 he became a professor at the Karlsruhe University of Arts and Design.

In 2018, Julien joined UC Santa Cruz, where he is the distinguished professor of the arts.

Julien is a patron of the Live Art Development Agency.

== Selected works ==
=== Installation pieces ===
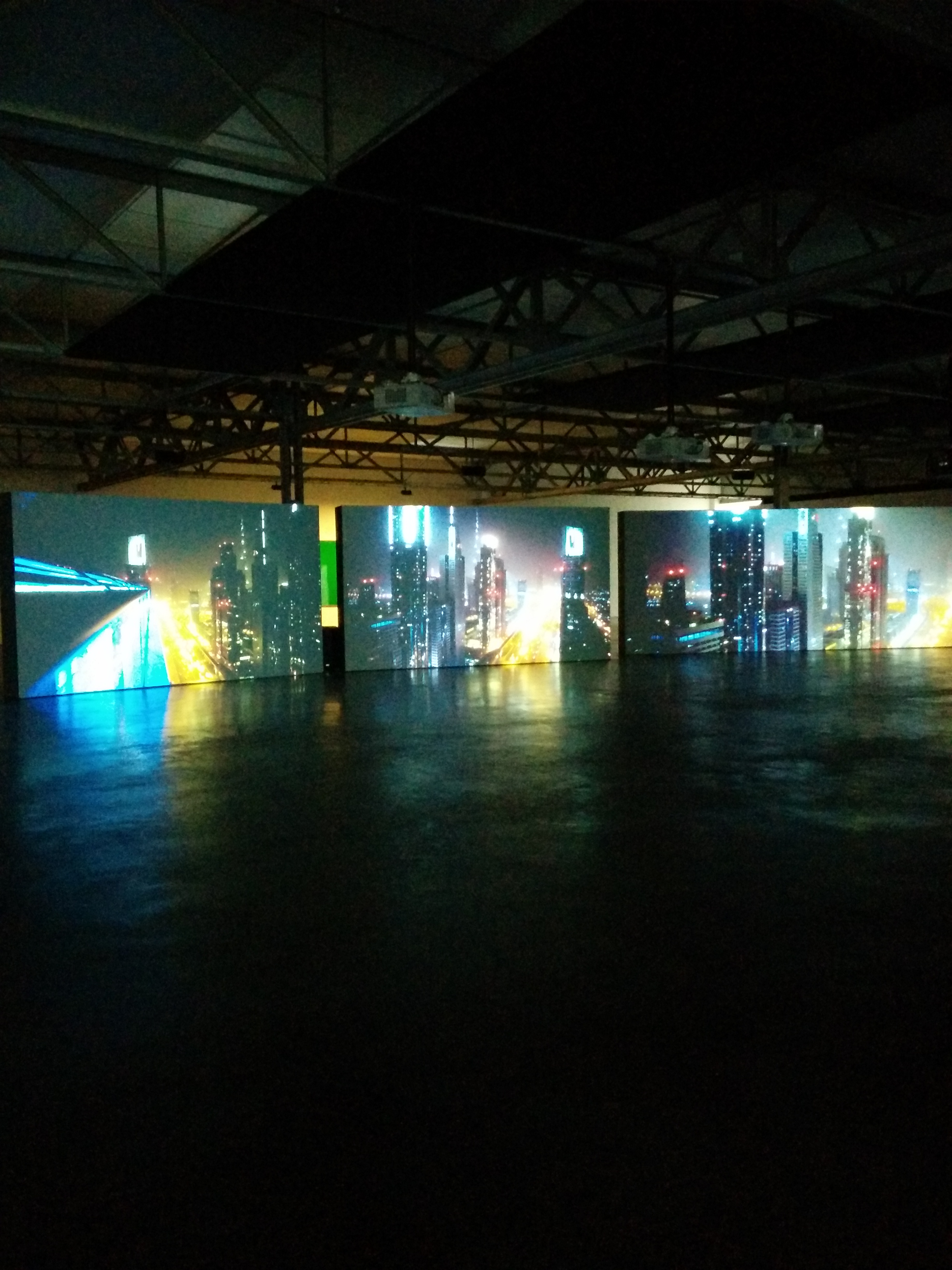
Playtime at the De Pont Museum of Contemporary Art in the Netherlands

- Vagabondia (2000)
- Paradise Omeros (2002)
- Baltimore (2003)
- Lost Boundaries (2003)
- Radioactive (2004)
- True North (2004)
- Fantôme Afrique (2005)
- Fantôme Créole (2005)
- WESTERN UNION: Small Boats (2007)
- Dungeness (2008)* Te Tonga Tuturu/True South (Apparatus) (2009)
- TEN THOUSAND WAVES (2010)
- PLAYTIME (2013)
- A Marvellous Entanglement (2019)
- Once Again... (Statues Never Die) (2022)
- All That Changes You... (Metamorphosis) (2025)

=== Filmography ===
- Who Killed Colin Roach? (1983)
- Territories (1984)
- The Passion of Remembrance (co-written and co-directed with Maureen Blackwood) (1986)
- This is Not an AIDS Advertisement (1987)
- Looking for Langston (1989)
- Young Soul Rebels (1991)
- Black and White in Colour (1992)
- The Attendant (1993)
- The Darker Side of Black (1994)
- The Question of Equality (senior producer) (1994)
- Frantz Fanon: Black Skin, White Mask (1996)
- Three (1999)
- The Long Road to Mazatlan (1999)
- Paradise Omeros (2002)
- BaadAsssss Cinema (2002)
- Baltimore (2003)
- Derek (2008)
- Ten Thousand Waves (2010)
- Kapital (2013)
- Playtime (2014)
- Stones Against Diamonds (2015)
- Lessons of the Hour: Frederick Douglass (2019). Grayson, Saisha. A Meditation on the Legacy of Frederick Douglass by Artist and Filmmaker Isaac Julien Smithsonian Magazine, February 28, 2025.
- 30/30 Vision: 3 Decades of Strand Releasing (segment "Isaac Julien") (2019)
- Lina Bo Bardi - A Marvelous Entanglement (2020)

== Awards ==
- Teddy Award for Looking for Langston (Best Short Film, 1989 Berlin International Film Festival)
- Semaine de la Critique Prize, Cannes Film Festival for Young Soul Rebels (1991)
- MIT Eugene McDermott Award in the Arts (2001)
- Frameline Lifetime Achievement Award (2002)
- David R. Kessler Award for LGBTQ Studies, CLAGS: The Center for LGBTQ Studies (2004)
- James Robert Brudner Memorial Prize and Lectureship, Yale University (2016–2017)
- Commander of the Order of the British Empire (CBE), for services to the arts (2017)
- Goslarer Kaiserring (2022)
- Honorary Fellow of the British Academy (2024)
