= List of Desmond's episodes =

Desmond's is a British television sitcom, created by Trix Worrell and broadcast on Channel 4 between 1989 and 1994. The series stars Norman Beaton as Desmond Ambrose, the owner of 'Desmond's', a barber shop located in Peckham, South London, where he resides with his family: his wife, Shirley (Carmen Munroe), and his children, Michael (Geff Francis), Gloria (Kimberley Walker) and Sean (Justin Pickett).

During the course of the programme, 71 episodes of Desmond's aired over six series, between 5 January 1989 and 19 December 1994.

== Series overview ==
Series	Episodes	Originally released	
Series	Episodes	First released	Last released
1	6	5 January 1989	9 February 1989
2	13	22 January 1990	16 April 1990
3	13	22 January 1991	3 February 1992
4	13	5 October 1992	28 December 1992
5	13	27 September 1993	20 December 1993
6	13	26 September 1994	19 December 1994

== Episodes ==
=== Series 1 (1989) ===
Series One aired on Thursdays at 8:30pm.

No. overall	No. in series	Title	Directed by	Written by	Original release date
1	1	"French Lessons"	Mandie Fletcher	Trix Worrell	5 January 1989
Desmond thinks Shirley is playing away when she begins to brag about her French teacher.
2	2	"The Offer"	Mandie Fletcher	Trix Worrell	12 January 1989
Desmond considers selling the shop to retire in Guyana early, when a smooth-talking businessman enters the shop. Deciding to apply for a loan to do up the shop instead, Desmond visits the bank only to find his eldest son Michael is the one who'll make the decision.
3	3	"Expansion Plans"	Mandie Fletcher	Trix Worrell	19 January 1989
Michael decides that the shop needs more employees and he introduces Tony, who gets the job as Desmond's assistant.
4	4	"Hello, Auntie Susu"	Mandie Fletcher	Trix Worrell	26 January 1989
Shirley's obnoxious older sister arrives but begins to annoy everyone when she takes without asking and does things how she wants in her sister's house.
5	5	"A Surprise for Porkpie"	Mandie Fletcher	Trix Worrell	2 February 1989
Porkpie disappoints everyone when he doesn't celebrate Shirley's birthday, because he needs a TV licence.
6	6	"Sad News"	Mandie Fletcher	Trix Worrell	9 February 1989
Gloria is going on a date with a gay politician, while Desmond and Shirley get news that their old friend and former band member of The Georgetown Dreamers, Sweetsticks, has died.

=== Series 2 (1990) ===
Series Two aired on Mondays at 8:30pm.

No. overall	No. in series	Title	Directed by	Written by	Original release date
7	1	"The Treatment"	Charlie Hanson	Trix Worrell	22 January 1990
Desmond is taken to hospital with an illness and he starts to consider his mortality.
8	2	"'old De Front Page" (Part 1)	Charlie Hanson	Trix Worrell	29 January 1990
Old gossip Beverly arrives with a funny feeling then the barbershop is held up by two struggling teens, armed with guns.
9	3	"'old De Front Page Again" (Part 2)	Charlie Hanson	Trix Worrell	5 February 1990
The barbershop is still under siege and the teens are armed with guns but they soon surrender when a public appeal from their parents is aired on the news.
10	4	"Veronica"	Charlie Hanson	Trix Worrell	12 February 1990
Sean has fallen in love with his study partner Veronica, and everyone is interested in what may happen; but Veronica won't shut up about Lee.
11	5	"A Microwave, Five Men and a Nappy"	Nic Phillips	Trix Worrell	19 February 1990
Shirley and Gloria are away for the weekend and a struggling mother leaves her baby with Desmond, Michael, Tony, Porkpie, and Matthew. This could mean trouble.
12	6	"Reunion"	Nic Phillips	Trix Worrell	26 February 1990
Michael is invited to a college reunion with his college mates and he is the only one that has not achieved his dream that they all wrote on a letter when they left college.
13	7	"Porkpies"	Nic Phillips	Trix Worrell	5 March 1990
Matthew is panicking now that his bossy obnoxious sister - Florence - and her husband are arriving from Africa; and since Matthew told them that he has business partners, Tony and Lee suddenly get a new job.
14	8	"For Love or Money"	Charlie Hanson	Trix Worrell	12 March 1990
Desmond, Porkpie, Vince, and Burt enter a music competition as The Georgetown Dreamers. Could this work out?
15	9	"Stop the World, I Want to Get Off"	Nic Phillips	Trix Worrell	19 March 1990
Shirley's upset and goes out for the day and meets a poor lady, and they become friends, but Desmond is too pre-occupied with a dominoes contest to realise Shirley's emotions.
16	10	"Here Comes De Sun"	Nic Phillips	Trix Worrell	26 March 1990
Porkpie starts a protest against the Channel Tunnel, and Gloria fails her exams and tries to hide it from Desmond. After seeing an old friend as a model, Gloria then decides that she would like to do the same; but it isn't all it seems.
17	11	"Kung You"	Nic Phillips	Trix Worrell	2 April 1990
Beverly is mugged and Shirley doesn't feel safe, So she takes up self-defence lessons.
18	12	"Auntie Susu"	Nic Phillips	Trix Worrell	9 April 1990
Auntie Susu returns but this time she is engaged to an 18-year-old hunk, William, AKA Her Little Willy. And Porkpie is determined to stop the wedding.
19	13	"Thirty Year Itch"	Nic Phillips	Trix Worrell	16 April 1990
Michael shows off his new girlfriend, and it's Desmond and Shirley's wedding anniversary.

=== Series 3 (1991–1992) ===
Series Three aired on Mondays at 8:30pm.

No. overall	No. in series	Title	Directed by	Written by	Original release date
20	1	"The Head Hunter"	Charlie Hanson	Carol Williams	28 October 1991
A lady arrives offering Shirley a job, but she then betrays her by making a pass at Desmond.
21	2	"The Peckham Pimpernel"	Charlie Hanson	Trix Worrell	4 November 1991
An old friend, Neville, turns up informing everyone is now a detective, but someone gives him his first case to solve by vandalising the shop and Neville works out it is one of the regulars in the shop, but who did it?
22	3	"A Day In The Life"	Trix Worrell	Trix Worrell	11 November 1991
After the siege, London Calling man, Leroy Smart, tells the Ambrose family he would like to do a documentary, which upsets everyone when he tells them this will feature only the Ambrose family and no one else.
23	4	"Smokeless Fuming"	Charlie Hanson	Trix Worrell	18 November 1991
Sean gets a new teacher at school who insists they call her by her first name and Sean suddenly develops a large crush on her.
24	5	"Relative Strangers"	Charlie Hanson	Trix Worrell	25 November 1991
Porkpie's long-lost daughter, Denise, turns up out of the blue and when Michael takes her out sight-seeing Porkpie worries that something will happen between them instantly causing sparks to fly between Porkpie, Desmond and Shirley.
25	6	"Vanity Merchants"	Charlie Hanson	Carol Williams	2 December 1991
Gloria and Louise decide to set up their own men's beauty business but when Michael doesn't give them money from the bank to help fund it, that makes them more determined to prove themselves.
26	7	"The Waiting Game"	Charlie Hanson	Trix Worrell	9 December 1991
Desmond and Shirley are waiting to go to a dinner and dance but Porkpie is late, Desmond changes his tie a million times and Louise fears she may be pregnant.
27	8	"Driving Me Crazy"	Lou Wakefield	Carol Williams	16 December 1991
Desmond decides to retake his driving test but this puts everyone in a cast or a coffin.
28	9	"Daydreams"	Lou Wakefield	Joan Hooley	6 January 1992
Desmond catches Shirley looking at house brochures, and despite her assurances that she was just allowing herself a little daydream, insists that they will not move until they retire to Guyana.
29	10	"Dobbin"	Lou Wakefield	Paul McKenzie and Laurence Goldbourne	13 January 1992
Everyone tries to persuade Desmond to give a speech to re-open the children's playground after a child gets hit by a car. Shirley accidentally sells Michael's old toy horse, Dobbin, which makes him accuse Shirley of being a bad parent.
30	11	"The Prodigal"	Lou Wakefield	Annie Bruce	20 January 1992
Michael's flat is being redecorated and shirley makes him stay at the shop which makes everyone annoyed. Desmond complains at every morning never being able to get in his bathroom.
31	12	"Too Young"	Lou Wakefield	Trix Worrell	27 January 1992
Desmond can't sleep at nights so he goes to see Dr. Patricia who prescribes exercise. Desmond gets a tracksuit and trainers that cost about £200 and starts behaving young. When Shirley has a go at him, he goes out and gets drunk. Michael has been ordered to go and keep and eye on him but fails. Desmond gets in a fight with a policeman and Michael tries to split them up but this leads to them both being thrown in a prison cell to cool off.
32	13	"The Roots Tradition"	Trix Worrell	Trix Worrell	3 February 1992
Michael is fed up with the shop not being run efficiently so he takes control. Shirley and Desmond get worried that he's not appreciating his roots but focusing too much on money.

=== Series 4 (1992) ===
Series Four aired on Mondays at 8:30pm.

No. overall	No. in series	Title	Directed by	Written by	Original release date
33	1	"All Things Bright"	Trix Worrell	Joan Hooley	5 October 1992
Shirley helps out at the church for a Sunday school but she has to take troublesome kids on an outing. One kid spoils it.
34	2	"Flats, Lies and Videotape"	Liddy Oldroyd	Paul McKenzie & Laurence Goldbourne	12 October 1992
Gloria decides she isn't staying with her bossy parents when Porkpie interferes, but Lee's "You've Been Framed Video" brings them all together again.
35	3	"Growing Pains"	Liddy Oldroyd	Trix Worrell	19 October 1992
Lee begins to wonder about his parents and can't make up his mind whether or not to find his mother.
36	4	"Lee's Journey"	Trix Worrell	Trix Worrell	26 October 1992
Lee arrives in Liverpool looking for his mum but she is in Peckham looking for him. And Lee's father is revealed.
37	5	"Calypso"	Liddy Oldroyd	Annie Bruce	2 November 1992
An old love rival of Desmond's arrives after thought to be dead, Could this be the end of Shirley and Desmond's marriage?
38	6	"The Kid"	Trix Worrell	Trix Worrell	9 November 1992
Shirley's little friend Daisy stays with the Ambroses for the weekend causing trouble for everyone. But she's not as stupid as she looks after she completes a crossword that no-one else can finish.
39	7	"Too Red Eye"	Trix Worrell	Alrick Riley	16 November 1992
Desmond tries to outbid his old rival, could Desmond win?
40	8	"Susu Again"	Trix Worrell	Trix Worrell	23 November 1992
Susu arrives in London and Porkpie is bitten by the love bug, But Susu leaves London engaged to Porkpie.
41	9	"Can't Buy Me Love"	Liddy Oldroyd	Annie Bruce	30 November 1992
Michael proves he still has a social life and a bit of spice left in him and he falls for a nightclub owner, Rochelle.
42	10	"Art Attack"	Trix Worrell	Carol Williams	7 December 1992
Gloria falls in love with an artist and Desmond falls in love with art.
43	11	"Go with the Flo"	Liddy Oldroyd	Carol Williams	14 December 1992
Florence, Matthew's sister, arrives again and is determined that when she heads back to The Gambia Matthew will be going with her to take over the family business.
44	12	"My Two Sons"	Liddy Oldroyd	Paul McKenzie and Laurence Goldbourne	21 December 1992
Michael is put in charge off redundancies at the bank but he takes it too far. And Sean gets the shop big business.
45	13	"The Godmother"	Liddy Oldroyd	Trix Worrell	28 December 1992
Beverley has a dream about Michael but when he announces he's engaged to Patricia, Beverley says it's not to be.

=== Series 5 (1993) ===
Series Five aired on Mondays at 8:30pm. Series 5 also saw the start of a new theme tune, with remixed instrumentation and an updated opening sequence.

No. overall	No. in series	Title	Directed by	Written by	Original release date
46	1	"A Class Act"	Jan Sargent	Annie Bruce	27 September 1993
Matthew is organising a concert for an African charity but his top of the bill has let him down. Does Desmond have the answer?
47	2	"Shimmer and Shine"	Jan Sargent	Joan Hooley	4 October 1993
Desmond is trying to get a customer to enter a hair competition called shimmer and shine. But who will represent Desmond's Salon?
48	3	"Halcyon Daze"	David Askey	Trix Worrell	11 October 1993
It's Sean's first day at University but is he ready top swap freedom for books?
49	4	"Lollipop Man"	Jan Sargent	Alrick Riley	18 October 1993
Porkpie has a new job as a lollipop man, and is proud of his position. After a rough day when he accidentally causes a traffic hold up, Porkpie begins to get doubts but later proves himself during a crisis.
50	5	"Pardnership"	Jan Sargent	Paul McKenzie and Laurence Goldbourne	25 October 1993
Everyone is annoyed when Beverley loses some money belonging to Desmond but this leads to other thinking Beverley has conned them.
51	6	"Fairy Tales"	David Askey	Carol Williams	1 November 1993
Gloria is angry with a magazine ad but her feisty attitude gives her a job at the magazine firm but she can't decide what to do her ad on. So enter Fairy-godmothers, Porkpie and Matthew.
52	7	"Love Match"	Iain McLean	Paul McKenzie & Laurence Goldbourne	8 November 1993
Matthew is in love and wants to get married. Again.
53	8	"Coughs and Sneezes"	Jan Sargent	Alrick Riley	15 November 1993
Desmond has a cold that is driving the customers away so when he is ordered to stay in bed Tony takes over the shop which has drastic consequences.
54	9	"Kiss of the Spiderman"	David Askey	Panji Anoff	22 November 1993
Spider persuades Desmond that he could get more customers but its all young teens, which doesn't please Desmond as the peace and quiet is short-lived because of the offensive lyrics in his ragga-rap songs.
55	10	"Two Lads and a Lady"	David Askey	Carol Williams	29 November 1993
Michael brings home a girlfriend called Melissa but she doesn't bank on Shirley recognising her as Lee's girlfriend, Mel.
56	11	"Shirley's Sermon"	David Askey	Joan Hooley	6 December 1993
Shirley organises a trip for some kids at the local church but the trip goes wrong when one kid decides to play around with Shirley.
57	12	"A Matter of Life and Death"	Iain McLean	Annie Bruce	13 December 1993
Lee has a Mini-accident on his Motorbike but doctors pick up a shadow on his brain and they tell him to fear the worst.
58	13	"The Patter of Little Feet"	Iain McLean	Trix Worrell	20 December 1993
Desmond tries to cope with the fact Gloria and Alex are sleeping together. Michael finds his high-flying university friends have all settled down with families and starts to see Mandy in a new light.

=== Series 6 (1994) ===
The sixth and final series aired on Mondays at 8:30pm. Series 6 was the final series prior to the death of actor Norman Beaton who died six days before the final episode was transmitted.

No. overall	No. in series	Title	Directed by	Written by	Original release date
59	1	"Do Me a Favour"	David Askey	Carol Williams	26 September 1994
After Tony has left, Desmond hires a new stylist, Ricky. But he's not as qualified as everyone else had hoped.
60	2	"Hatchet Job"	David Askey	Annie Bruce	3 October 1994
There are lots of arguments as Porkpie loses a few pages of his memoirs and they are insulting to a man named Desmond but is it the same Desmond who has been his friend for years? Michael and Mandy's new relationship is flourishing until Mandy hears that Michael is planning to sack her.
61	3	"Georgetown Dreaming"	David Askey	Panji Anoff	10 October 1994
Shirley and Desmond look at the good and bad points of what life would have been like if they had moved back to Guyana.
62	4	"Demon Barber II (Turbo)"	David Askey	Laurence Goldbourne	17 October 1994
Sean is fed up with Desmond's bossy attitude so he and Spider agree to sell a new video game named The Demon Barber, but Desmond soon finds out it's based on him.
63	5	"Love Letters"	David Askey	Joan Hooley	24 October 1994
Beverley leaves Cuthbert after she finds some love letters from him.
64	6	"Planning Permission"	David Askey	Paul McKenzie	31 October 1994
Desmond announces over dinner the plans for the house when he moves back to Guyana but Shirley wants to stay in England, so because he doesn't discuss it with her she stops speaking to him.
65	7	"The Speech"	Iain McLean	Paulette Randall	7 November 1994
Desmond has to make a speech for a hairdressing conference but he leaves it behind at the shop and Gloria has posted it with some letters so it's down to the others to re-write a new speech.
66	8	"Judgement Day"	Iain McLean	Patricia Elcock	14 November 1994
An American preacher sues Desmond for a bad haircut that happened around 20 years ago. So Lee has to try to change the mind of his lawyer niece but taking her out for dates.
67	9	"The Return of Hyacinth Green"	Iain McLean	Paul McKenzie	21 November 1994
The same old love flame of Porkpie which ruined his first marriage returns and they're at it again but Shirley warns Porkpie and Hyacinth they if they hurt Susu they will pay. Has Hyacinth ruined Porkpie's future again?
68	10	"Heavy Traffic"	Unknown	Annie Bruce	28 November 1994
Lee falls in love with a sexy aromatherapist who fails to tell him she is also a part-time traffic warden.
69	11	"When the Cat's Away"	Iain McLean	Annie Bruce	5 December 1994
Whilst Desmond is away, the shop starts struggling. So Shirley has to call in an enemy of Desmond's but he makes a pass at Shirley so she plots a way to get him out of the shop by telling him he could be under threat from another client.
70	12	"A Sign of the Times"	Iain McLean	Michael Ellis	12 December 1994
Desmond is suffering from executive stress and he gets a new neon sign but since Lee is setting up the sign Desmond isn't going to get much rest. Lee causes a mild electrocution to anyone holding metal at the time, he also causes a power cut and at the end of the episode some of the letters go out so the sign reads DE*MON* instead of Desmond's.
71	13	"O Little Town of Peckham" (60 minute special)	Iain McLean	Carol Williams	19 December 1994
It's Christmas and as Gloria is spending it with Alex while Michael and Mandy are spending it with her parents, Shirley and Desmond visit the sick children at the hospital with Porkpie as Santa and Lee as Boom Boom Sally (a woman).
