= Pork pie hat =

Style of headwear

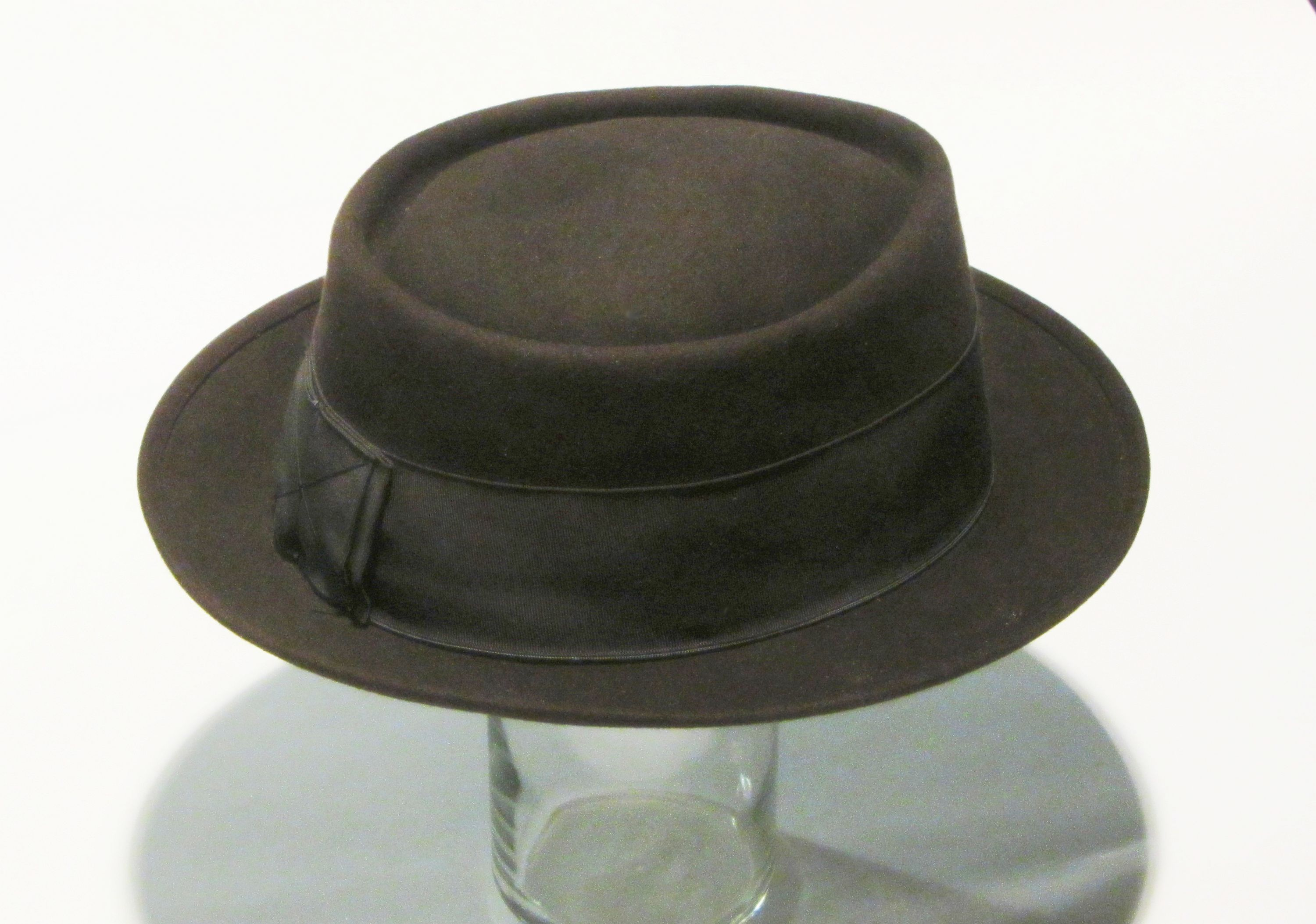
A classic brown felt men's pork pie hat from the 1940s. The bow in the back of the hat conceals a small button on a string which winds around the hat: in windy weather the button would be attached to the lapel of a jacket to keep the hat from blowing away.

A pork pie hat is one of several different styles of hat that have been worn since the mid-19th century. The pork pie hat gained further popularity in the 20th century, being worn by famous actors and musicians. This style of hat features a flat crown that resembles a traditional pork pie, thus earning its name.

== The pork pie hat in 19th-century fashion ==
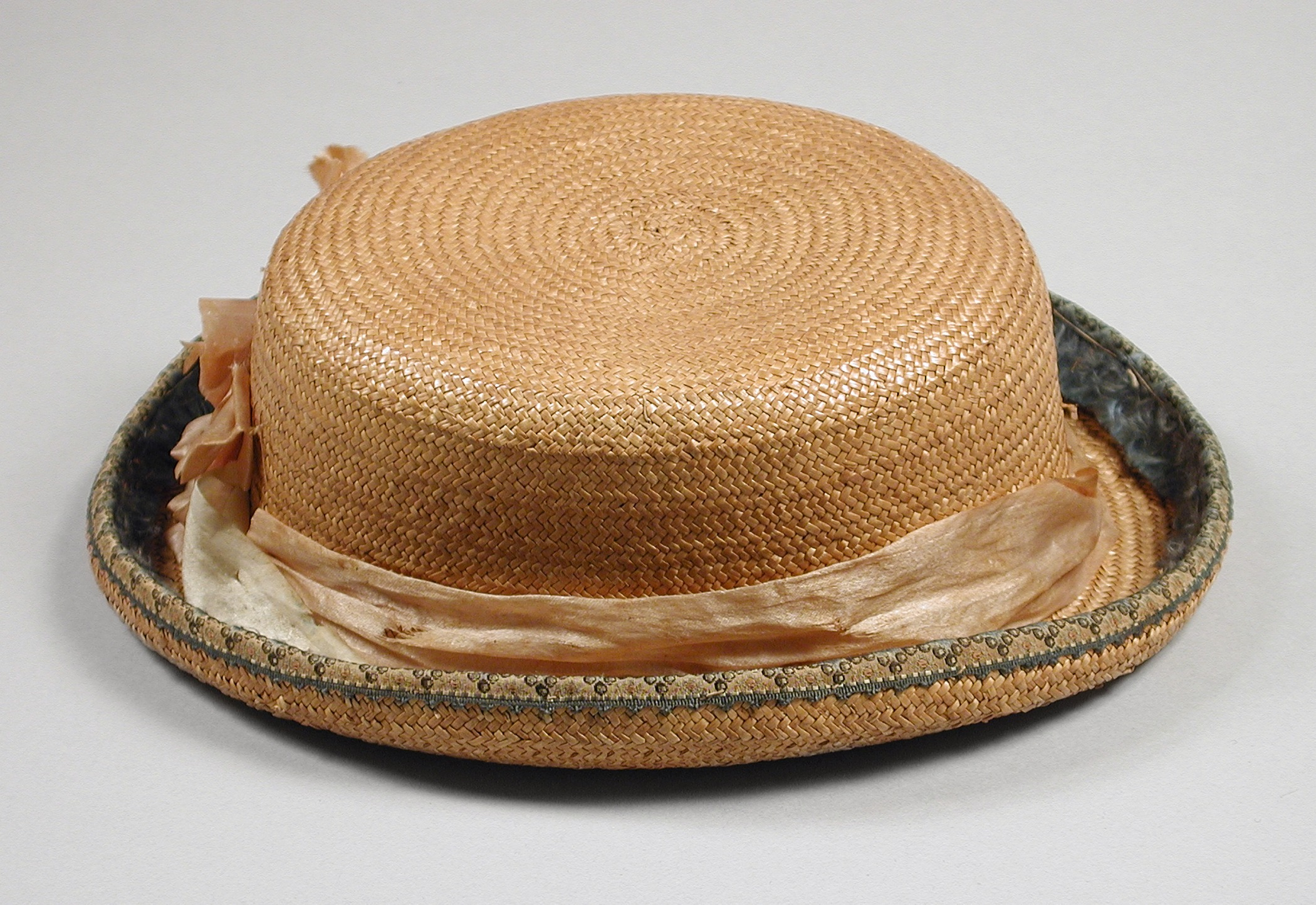
Child's pork pie hat, probably American. Plaited straw and silk ribbon, ca. late 19th century. Los Angeles County Museum of Art, 41.11.34.

The origins of the pork pie hat in Western fashion lay in the 1860s. Initially an item of women's wear, this accessory was identifiable through its shape, particularly the narrow brim which distinctively curled round towards the crown of the hat, which was flat, and usually made from straw or velvet in this period. The pork pie hat was small, and would be worn towards the front of the head to account for popular hairstyles of the era. The fashion for pork pie hats soon spread, also becoming a feature of menswear. As a men's accessory, the pork pie was larger, and could be fashioned with decorative ribbons to the back of the hat.

== Buster Keaton and the 1920s ==
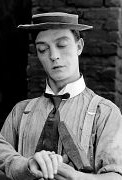
Actor Buster Keaton wearing one of his signature felt pork pie hats

The pork pie began to gain further popularity in Britain as a man's hat not long after the turn of the 20th century in the fashion style of the man-about-town, with famous entertainers sporting this style regularly. Silent film actor Buster Keaton converted fedoras into straw boater-like felt pork pies by stiffening their brims with a dried sugar-water solution. This kind of pork pie had a very flat top and similar short flat brim.

== 1930s and 1940s ==
The heyday of the pork pie hat occurred during the Great Depression, following the straw boater era that peaked in the Roaring Twenties. In this incarnation, the pork pie regained its snap brim and increased slightly in height. Its dished crown became known among hatmakers as "telescopic crowns" or "tight telescopes" because when worn the top could be made to pop up slightly. Furthermore, as stated in a newspaper clipping from the mid-1930s: "The true pork pie hat is so made that it cannot be worn successfully except when telescoped." The same clipping refers to the hat also as "the bi crowned". Among famous wearers of the pork pie during this era are Frank Lloyd Wright, whose pork pie hat had a very wide brim and rather tall crown. Lester Young, whose career as a jazz saxophonist spanned from the mid-1920s to the late 1950s, regularly wore a pork pie hat during his performances, and after his death Charles Mingus composed a musical elegy in Young's honor entitled "Goodbye Pork Pie Hat". Young's pork pie had a broader brim than seen in earlier styles but retained the definitive round, flat, creased crown.

Physicist Robert Oppenheimer, scientific director of the World War II project that developed the atomic bomb, frequently wore a porkpie hat. (Note: https://discover.lanl.gov/news/0420-oppenheimer-birthday)

In African American culture in the 1940s the pork pie—flashy, feathered, color-coordinated—became associated with the zoot suit. By 1944 the hat was even prevalent in New Guinea, worn by at least some Australian soldiers.

== Post-1950s ==
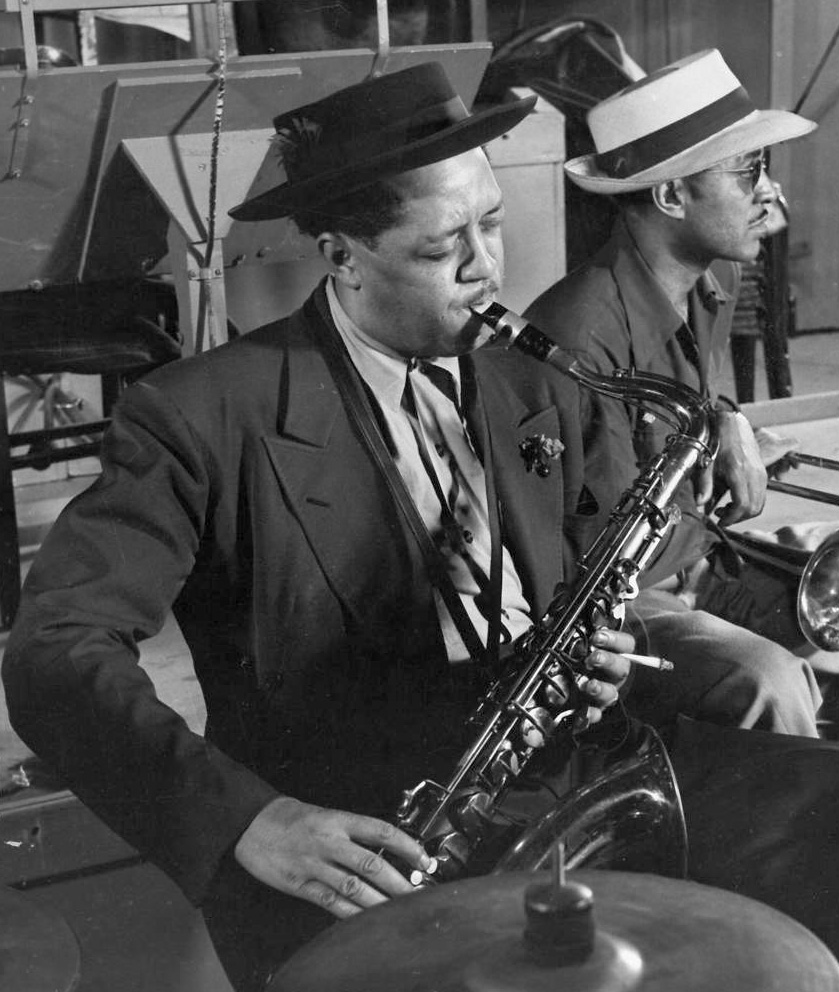
Saxophonist Lester Young. Fellow Jazz musician Charles Mingus memorialized him in "Goodbye Pork Pie Hat"

After the end of World War II the pork pie's broad popularity declined somewhat, though as a result of the zoot suit connection it continued its association with African American music culture, particularly jazz, blues, and ska. In television between 1951 and 1955, Art Carney frequently wore one in his characterization of Ed Norton in The Honeymooners, and in Puerto Rico the actor Joaquín Monserrat, known as Pacheco, was the host of many children's 1950s TV shows and was known for his straw pork pie hat and bow tie—in this incarnation, the pork pie returned to its Buster Keaton style with rigidly flat brim and extremely low flat crown.

In the 1960s in Jamaica, the "rude boy" subculture popularized the pork-pie, as well as hats resembling tall trilby styles. Jamaican diaspora brought the pork pie hat back into style in the United Kingdom through the connecting of youth cultures. When migration to the United Kingdom increased following the end of the Second World War and government calls for post-war reconstruction (see Windrush generation, British Nationality Act), shared musical and style interests thereby influenced the appearance of garments such as the pork pie hat in the emergent youth mod and rave subculture.

The porkpie hat enjoyed a slight resurgence in exposure and popularity after Gene Hackman's character Jimmy "Popeye" Doyle wore one in the 1971 film The French Connection. Doyle was based on real-life policeman Eddie Egan, who played the captain in the film, and his exploits. Egan was famous all his life for wearing a pork pie hat. At about the same time, Robert De Niro wore a pork pie hat in the 1973 film Mean Streets (the same hat he wore when he auditioned for the film).

Further, the Two-Tone Ska revival of the 1970s also contributed to the revival of the pork pie hat in youth culture and fashion in the United Kingdom, where black and white tailored garments were coupled with this style of hat, as worn by members of bands The Specials and The Selecter, for example.

== Contemporary associations ==
A frequent wearer of pork pie hats is Panamanian salsa singer and composer Ruben Blades. In the early 21st century, the wearing of a pork pie hat retained some of its 1930s and '40s associations. Fashion writer Glenn O'Brien says:

The porkpie hat is the mark of the determined hipster, the kind of cat you might see hanging around a jazz club or a pool hall, maybe wearing a button-front leather jacket and pointy shoes. It's a Tom Waits, Johnny Thunders kind of hat. It has a narrower brim than a fedora and a flat top with a circular indent. Usually the brim is worn up. It is often worn with a goatee, soul patch, and/or toothpick.

The character of Detective Meldrick Lewis (played by Clark Johnson) in the 1990s American series Homicide: Life on the Street wears a pork pie hat as part of his style. Several of the hats worn by Johnson were auctioned off after the end of the series.

Bryan Cranston's character Walter White wears a pork pie hat in the AMC series Breaking Bad when he appears as his alter ego "Heisenberg", whose persona is associated with the hat. Sony Pictures Television donated "Heisenberg's" hat to the Smithsonian Institution.

The character of Porkpie in the British sitcom Desmond's (played by Ram John Holder) gained his nickname from his pork pie hat. He also appeared in his own spin-off series, Porkpie.

== See also ==
- List of hat styles
