= Count Prince Miller =

Jamaican-born British actor and musician (1934–2018)

- Born: Clarence Linberg Miller; 30 March 1934 near Port Maria, Jamaica
- Origin: Saint Mary, Jamaica
- Died: 16 August 2018 (aged 84)
- Genres: Reggae
- Occupations: Singer, actor
- Years active: 1960s–2018
- Labels: Trojan Records, Hawk Records

Clarence Linberg Miller CD (30 March 1934 – 16 August 2018), better known as Count Prince Miller, was a Jamaican-born British actor and musician.

== Biography ==
Miller began as a musician, recording a number of reggae songs. His best known song is "Mule Train Parts One & Two", which was a hit on Trojan Records in 1971, before being re-recorded with Sly and Robbie in the early 1980s. Adding elements of music hall performance to his reggae style, Miller drew comparison with Judge Dread for his somewhat bawdy music. He also regularly appeared with Jimmy James. Known as something of a showman Miller was picked to compere the 1969 Wembley Reggae Festival, the first major reggae music event in Britain.

Count Prince Miller died in a London hospice August 16 2018 at age-84 after battling prostate cancer. The funeral service for the Veteran Jamaican Entertainer was held on September 4 at the Holy Trinity Church in Kensington, London.

== Music ==
Miller recorded a single, "Blue Blue World" bw "Somethin' to Make You Feel Good" which was released on Pye 7N 17786 in 1969. In 1978, he recorded "Red Red Wine" bw "Dub Red Red Wine" which was released on Raymond Morrison's Hawk label. It was credited to Count Prince Miller with Tamashante.

=== Acting ===
As an actor Miller's credits include the role of Vince in the Channel 4 sitcom Desmond's, initially an occasional role until the last series, when he became a regular. The character was a member of the fictional group the Georgetown Dreamers, in which Miller was joined by fellow musicians Ram John Holder and Sol Raye, as well as the show's star Norman Beaton. Miller's role continued in the spin-off series, Porkpie.

Earlier, in 1962, Miller appeared as a nightclub dancer in the 1962 James Bond film, Dr. No.

In 1992 acted in Damned the Day I Met You.

Miller went on to make an appearance in the 2003 film What a Girl Wants, while he secured Best Male Actor Award at the 2006 Black Film Makers' International Awards Ceremony for his role in Winnie and the Duppy Bat. Additionally, Miller played a small role in the 2017 film, Kingsman: The Golden Circle, as 'Elderly Patient 2'.

Miller also appeared in plays, two of which were written by J. D. Douglas (Black Heroes and JA Story). He was praised for his portrayal of Marcus Garvey in the former.

== Honours ==
In 2007, Miller was made a Commander of the Order of Distinction for his contributions to the music industry in Jamaica.
