= Trevor Thomas (actor) =

British actor

- Occupation: Actor
- Notable work: Black Joy (1977)

Trevor Thomas is a British actor. From around the late 1970s, he acted mostly in television programmes, but also starred in the 1977 film Black Joy, alongside Norman Beaton, as well as in stage productions.

In Black Joy, Thomas played the part of an innocent Guyanese "country boy", newly arrived as an immigrant to London, on a fruitless search for a relative's address, and having instead to navigate the challenges of a chaotic Brixton life in the 1970s. Among Thomas's other film credits are Yesterday's Hero (1979), A Hole In Babylon (1979), Inseminoid (1981), Sheena (1984), Underworld (1985), Playing Away (1987) and The Nine Lives of Tomas Katz (2000).

His television appearances include Space: 1999 (1976), The Fosters ("Take Your Partners", 1977), The Professionals ("Klansmen", 1977), Rockliffe's Babies ("Sweet and Sour Revenge", 1987), Silent Witness ("The World Cruise", 2000), Minder ("Gunfight at the O.K. Laundrette", 1979, and "Fiddler on the Hoof", 1989) and The Sweeney ("The Bigger They Are", 1978).
