= Desmond's =

1989 British TV sitcom

- Genre: Sitcom
- Created by: Trix Worrell
- Starring: Norman Beaton; Carmen Munroe; Ram John Holder; Gyearbuor Asante
- Country of origin: United Kingdom
- Original language: English
- No. of series: 6
- No. of episodes: 71 (list of episodes)

Production
- Executive producers: Al Mitchell; Humphrey Barclay
- Producers: Humphrey Barclay; Charlie Hanson
- Camera setup: Multi-camera
- Running time: 25 minutes 50 minutes (1 episode)
- Production company: Humphrey Barclay Productions

Original release
- Network: Channel 4
- Release: 5 January 1989 – 19 December 1994

Related
- Porkpie

Desmond's is a British television sitcom broadcast by Channel 4 from 5 January 1989 to 19 December 1994. Conceived and co-written by Trix Worrell, and produced by Charlie Hanson and Humphrey Barclay, Desmond's stars Norman Beaton as barber Desmond Ambrose, whose shop is a gathering place for an assortment of local characters. The show is set in Peckham, London, and features a predominantly black British Guyanese cast. With 71 episodes, Desmond's became Channel 4's longest running sitcom in terms of episodes.

== Notability ==
While the show was not the first black (or predominantly black) British television situation comedy (The Fosters, produced by London Weekend Television, aired 1976–77), Desmond's was the first to be set mainly in the workplace, providing an insight into black family life different from what had been seen before on British television.

The characters had aspirations (Desmond to return to Guyana, Michael to run his own branch of the bank, Gloria to get a job in fashion, Sean to go to university) and were socially mobile. The vast majority of the crew were also black.

Worrell wanted to show that prejudice existed not just between broad ethnic groups, but also within them. The show reveals antagonism between recent African immigrants and established Caribbeans based on their differences in aspirations. While Matthew was the frequent butt of jokes from the West Indian characters, particularly Porkpie and Desmond, he also regularly pointed out the strength of African history with his repeated interjection, "There's an old African saying..."

In 1989, Channel 4 described Desmond's as "the most instantly popular home-grown situation comedy in the channel's history," with the series appealing to a broad spectrum of the British public. The series had an average viewership per episode of 3.5 million people. Desmond's continued to perform well in subsequent years, scoring consistently in the channel's Top 20 programmes. By 1993, Desmond's was still considered Channel 4's most popular home-grown sitcom. Speaking about his experiences while visiting Jamaica, Norman Beaton said he was "known in virtually every parish" because of his role in Desmond's.

== Creation ==
While Trix Worrell was at the National Film and Television School, he won a writers' competition organised by Channel 4, which led to producer Humphrey Barclay contacting him about writing a comedy. Although apprehensive about the idea of writing a comedy, Worrell agreed to a meeting with Barclay. While on the bus to the meeting, his bus stopped by the barber shop he went to during his childhood. Worrell got the idea to create a comedy set in a barber's shop that serves more as a community centre, which was the idea he pitched to Barclay.

== Production ==
Desmond's was filmed with a multi-camera setup in front of a live studio audience of three hundred people, with the audience's laughter and reactions recorded into the episode audio. To dispel the misconception that the laughter was a dubbed track added in post-production, an audience-participation moment was left in Series 4, Episode 5, "Calypso." In a scene with Desmond writing a song for Shirley with very simple lyrics, the audience shouts out the last word of the verse.

Episodes were filmed at the LWT Tower in Lambeth, Central London.

== Characters ==
Much of the success of the show came from the dynamics and relationships both within the Ambrose family and with the other characters in the show who spent time in the shop.

=== The Ambrose family ===
The Ambroses are the central family around which the show was built.

- Desmond Ambrose (Norman Beaton) is the protagonist and owner of the barbershop, which is named after him. Desmond's relative lack of skill at barbering is a running joke through the series. Desmond dreams of building a house in Guyana and returning there to retire, although Shirley is reluctant to go with him. In his youth in Guyana, he played the trumpet in his band, The Georgetown Dreamers, and was known as "Jazzy D." In the spin-off Porkpie, it was revealed that Desmond had died (as Norman Beaton had died the previous year).
- Shirley Ambrose (née Pleshette) (Carmen Munroe) is Desmond's wife and mother of their three children; she works together with Desmond in the barbershop. Shirley often solves the problems of the other characters. Shirley is the only member of the Ambrose family not to appear in an episode of the spin-off Porkpie as it is revealed that she has decided to return to Guyana.
- Michael Ambrose (Geff Francis), Desmond and Shirley's elder son, is an assistant bank manager. He later becomes a manager. He was not introduced until the second episode, when Shirley suggested that Desmond go to the bank and get a loan to renovate the shop. He owns half the barbershop. Michael and Desmond have an antagonistic relationship.
- Gloria Jeanette Elaine Ambrose (Kimberly Walker) is the only daughter of Desmond and Shirley. She starts the series as a teenager finishing secondary school, and her arc follows her as she matures, aspiring to become an "independent woman of the '90s". Instead of going to university, she decides to become a fashion writer. She eventually moves out to live with her boyfriend, Alex.
- Sean Ambrose (Justin Pickett) is the youngest child in the Ambrose family. He is experienced with computers and coding. He goes through various phases over his adolescence as he discovers his identity and deals with puberty, including a period when he frequently raps and a bad boy phase. He performs ragga music with his best friend, Spider, but stops when he starts attending university in Series 5.

=== Other characters ===
- Augustus Neapolitan Cleveland "Porkpie" Grant (Ram John Holder) is Desmond's best friend who frequently spends time at the barbershop. He plays the acoustic guitar in The Georgetown Dreamers. His nickname derives from his habit of always wearing a pork pie hat. His wife Gwendolyn left him many years earlier after catching him cheating; she took their two children with her. He gets a job as a lollipop man in Series 5. Porkpie has his own spin-off series, Porkpie.
- Matthew Joffor (Gyearbuor Asante) is a perpetual student from The Gambia who has spent decades studying at university level in London, earning several degrees. He also spends a significant amount of time at the barbershop; he and Porkpie frequently bicker and insult each other. He regularly asserts the superiority of Africans over West Indians, and often interjects with, "There's an old African saying..."
- Louise Dixon (Lisa Geoghan) is Gloria's best friend in the first four series, and also the first white character to appear in the series. She goes away to university between the fourth and fifth seasons.
- Lee Stanley (Robbie Gee) is the local wide-boy wheeler-dealer, often trying to sell his wares to the regulars in the shop. He habitually flirts with women, and is a boxer under the name of The Peckham Prince. He frequently drives the other characters places. He does not know his mother or father until the fourth series, having grown up in a home for children, but Shirley and Desmond treat him as their son.
- Lewis (Lewis St. Juste) is very often in the background of the barbershop, using the payphone; however, he has very few lines over the course of the series. He first speaks in the third episode of the second series, when Shirley asked him his name.
- Amanda "Mandy" Mosgrove (Matilda Thorpe) is Michael's PA and is obviously infatuated with him, although Michael does not realize until the fifth series, when they start dating. She is the second white character to appear in the series. In episode two of the sixth series, Michael proposes to her. In Series 6, she becomes a becomes a financial director of an art gallery. In the spin-off series, Porkpie, it is revealed that Mandy married Michael and took the Ambrose surname.
- Tony (Dominic Keating) is hired by Michael as the part-time hairstylist for Desmond's barbershop to bring in more customers. He is the third white character to appear in the series, and of the white characters, he appears the most frequently. Tony often wears colourful, eccentric outfits and is regarded by the younger characters as "trendy." He leaves between Seasons 5 and 6 to become a hairdresser on a cruise ship.
- Doreen Wilma "Susu" Pleshette (Mona Hammond), usually referred to as Auntie Susu, is Shirley's sister who acts and dresses much younger than her age. She has a number of romantic and sexual dalliances. Prior to her engagement to Porkpie, she was married to (and divorced from) Maxwell, with whom she had several sons. In the fourth series, Susu gets deported to Jamaica; in the final series of the spin-off show Porkpie, she returns to England to marry Porkpie.
- Neville "Nev" James (Treva Etienne) is a friend of the Ambrose family who was a police constable; he later becomes a Detective Constable CID. He went to school with Lee and Michael as a child. He only appears in three episodes across the second and third seasons.
- Beverley McIntosh (Joan Ann Maynard) is a good friend of Shirley's, Michael's godmother and the local gossip. She always wears a hat that resembles a tea cosy. Other characters often find her annoying – Desmond is particularly antagonistic towards her. She often speaks about her ailments and the many medications she has to take, as well as having to prepare her husband's Cuthbert's red mullet. The couple has four children: three sons and a daughter, Merlene.
- Vince (Count Prince Miller) becomes a part-time assistant in the barbershop in the final series to replace Tony. He is also the drummer for The Georgetown Dreamers.
- Burt (Sol Raye) plays the electric guitar in The Georgetown Dreamers, along with Desmond, Porkpie, Vince, and, formerly, Sweetsticks.
- Andrew "Spider" Webb (Robert McKewley) is Sean's best friend after Series 3 and has an open crush on Gloria. He plays ragga music and is an entrepreneur; semi-famous under the name Spider Ranks, he eventually becomes semi-famous as a dancehall artist, although other characters criticise him for misogynistic and homophobic lyrics. Desmond and Shirley disapprove of him.
- Alex Reynolds (Chris Tummings) is Gloria's boyfriend from Series 4. He is a strict vegetarian and an abstract artist who works in various media. Gloria and Alex move in together towards the end of the series. It is revealed in the first episode of the Porkpie spin-off series that Alex and Gloria are still together.
- Bernie (Rhashan Stone) is the first friend that Sean made at university on his first day. He is openly gay.
- Ronni (Teohna Williams) is Gloria's best friend in Series 5 and 6.
- Ricky Flaxman (Dean Gatiss) is Tony's replacement in the final season. He gets the job as the new barber's assistant although he is underqualified, having only been a dog groomer, because Desmond owes his father a favour in exchange for supplying an alibi. Ricky moves into Gloria's room after she moved out to live with Alex. Through Season 6, Desmond teaches him about barbering.
- Sweetsticks is sometimes mentioned in the show although he never appears on screen. He was a member of The Georgetown Dreamers as their steelpan player and is often cited by Desmond and Porkpie as having been a ladies' man, a liar, and a cheat. He was revealed to be Lee's father.

== Episodes ==
During the course of the series, 71 episodes of Desmond's aired between 1989 and 1994. Desmond's ran for 6 series. 70 episodes had a runtime of 30 minutes, while the final episode had a runtime of 60 minutes.

The last episode, the Desmond's Christmas Special was already announced as the last ever Desmond's episodes when Norman Beaton died a few days before the transmission of said episode.

Series	Episodes	Originally released	
Series	Episodes	First released	Last released
1	6	5 January 1989	9 February 1989
2	13	22 January 1990	16 April 1990
3	13	22 January 1991	3 February 1992
4	13	5 October 1992	28 December 1992
5	13	27 September 1993	20 December 1993
6	13	26 September 1994	19 December 1994

== Theme song ==
The series theme song "Don't Scratch My Soca," performed by Beaton, was used in the opening credits throughout the entire run. A version without the vocals was used in the closing credits. At the beginning of Series 5, the theme received an update which added more percussion. The instrumental was used as the basis for a song by The Georgetown Dreamers, Desmond's old band.

The full theme was released on Apple Music on 21 June 2021, and as a limited edition 7" vinyl on 1 October 2021.

== Accolades ==
Desmond's won the British Comedy Award for Best C4 Sitcom in 1992.

In 1994, Desmond's was nominated for a BAFTA Award under the category of Comedy Programme or Series.

Desmond's (Humphrey Barclay Productions) won the Team Award at the 1994 Royal Television Society Programme Awards.

Norman Beaton was awarded the Royal Television Society Best Comedy Performer Award for his role as Desmond Ambrose in 1994.

A clip from Series 1, Episode 6, "Sad News" was used in the segment celebrating British film and television in the 2012 Summer Olympics opening ceremony.

== Legacy ==
The show had a unique method of team writing that raised the profile of some writers, such as playwright Michael J. Ellis, who later worked on other shows, including the BBC's all-black sketch show The Real McCoy, and Worrell himself, who became a film writer.

Desmond's was featured on the BBC Radio 4 programme Britain in a Box on 11 May 2013.

In 2018, the British Film Institute (BFI) partnered with We Are Parable for that year's Comedy Genius season. We Are Parable were commissioned by the BFI to create a barbershop experience to celebrate Desmond's for a project titled The Comedy Cuts Barbershop. A pop-up barbershop inspired by Desmond's was created and toured around various locations in the United Kingdom in 2018 and 2019, including a pre-existing barbershop. The series was screened during these events.

In 2019, Channel 4 and Gal-dem collaborated for Black History Month by curating a Black British History collection highlighting the impact of black British content creators on television. Desmond's was one of the six titles covered in this collection.

In October 2026, it was announced that a stage musical adaptation of Desmond's was in development.

=== Streaming ===
The full series was published for viewing on All 4 through YouTube. With 71 episodes, it remains Channel 4's longest running sitcom in terms of the number of episodes produced. The complete series was added to Netflix UK between 8 October 2021 to 2 October 2023. In the UK, Desmond's is available for streaming via the Channel 4 website.

=== Re-runs ===
- Re-runs aired in the USA on BET in the early 1990s.
- The show was shown on NYC Media as part of their Caribbean programming on Sunday nights in the late 1990s up until 2007.
- From 1997 until late 2000, Paramount Comedy re-ran the show.
- Trouble, a channel in the UK, began showing re-runs of Desmond's in September 2007.
- On 14 January 2013, The Africa Channel International (which was on Sky channel 209 & Virgin Media channel 828) relaunched Desmond's on weeknights at 7pm and 11pm.
- In November 2015, London Live started airing repeats of the series.
- On 21 February 2022, the UK channel Gold started showing the series. Repeats continued into 2023 and 2024.
- The UK channel U&Drama started airing repeats on 31 July 2024.

== Home media ==
=== Region 2 DVD ===
Channel 4 DVD has released the first two series on DVD in the UK. Series One was released on 1 October 2007. Series Two was released on 13 April 2008.

=== Region 1 DVD ===
Visual Entertainment has begun releasing Desmond's on DVD in Canada. To date they have released the first four series of the show on DVD. Series 1 and 2 were released on 27 March 2007. Series 3 was released on 3 November 2009. On 2 March 2010, VEI released Desmond's- The Collection: Series One to Four, a seven-disc set featuring all episodes from the first four seasons.

=== On demand ===
All six seasons are available to stream in the UK on the Channel 4 service All 4 and through the streaming services Amazon Prime and Netflix.

== Follow-up ==
Following the end of Desmond's in 1994, a spin-off series was made with Porkpie in the title role. It ran for twelve episodes over two series in 1995 and 1996.
