= Humphrey Barclay =

British comedy executive and producer

- Born: 24 March 1941 (age 85); Dorking, Surrey, England, United Kingdom
- Education: Trinity College, Cambridge
- Occupations: Comedy Executive, TV and radio producer
- Known for: Founder of Barclay Productions (TV production firm)

Humphrey Barclay BEM (born 24 March 1941) is a British comedy executive and producer.

== Career ==
Barclay was educated at Harrow School, before reading Classics at Trinity College, Cambridge, where his first foray into show business was via the Amateur Dramatic Society. He then appeared in Cambridge Footlights revues alongside Tim Brooke-Taylor, Bill Oddie, John Cleese, Graham Chapman, David Hatch, Jonathan Lynn, Jo Kendall and Miriam Margolyes. Barclay was offered a job as a BBC radio producer and soon afterwards put together the team who performed the comedy show I'm Sorry, I'll Read That Again (four series starting in 1964). Moving to television, Barclay oversaw at Associated-Rediffusion, the sketch show series Do Not Adjust Your Set (1967–69).

Following the ITV franchise changes of 1968, Barclay joined London Weekend Television (LWT), for whom he produced the Doctor... series (1969–77). One episode in that series involved a hotel proprietor and his wife and was written by John Cleese. Barclay said at the time that he thought there might be a series in the characters. Later, Cleese created Fawlty Towers for the BBC.

In 1975, he produced the Donald Sinden/Elaine Stritch sit-com Two's Company, which received the "Best Situation Comedy" BAFTA nomination in 1977. Barclay became Head of Comedy at LWT in 1977 and supervised successful series, including No, Honestly and A Fine Romance (1981–84). In May 1980, he unveiled Metal Mickey as a show "with the appeal of Star Wars, the Daleks and Mork and Mindy".

Following criticism at the Edinburgh International Television Festival of what was seen as casual racism in the LWT series Mind Your Language (1977–79; 1986), Barclay commissioned No Problem!, transmitted by Channel 4 during 1983–85, the first original black-made sitcom for British TV (an earlier series featuring a black family, The Fosters (ITV, 1976–77), had been a remake of a US show).

Barclay left LWT in 1983 and formed Humphrey Barclay Productions, which produced the media satire Hot Metal (ITV, 1986–1988), medical sitcom Surgical Spirit (ITV, 1989–95), and sitcom Desmond's (Channel 4, 1989–94) with black characters. In 1996, he returned to LWT as Controller of Comedy and, in 1999, became Head of Comedy Development for Granada Media International.

Though already in partial retirement, in April 2002, he joined Celador Productions as Development Executive.

== Selected Filmography ==
Year	Title	Role	Network	Notes
1967 - 1969	Do Not Adjust Your Set	Producer	ITV (Rediffusion/ Thames)	19 episodes
1969	The Complete and Utter History of Britain	Producer	ITV (LWT)	6 episodes
1969 - 1970	Doctor in the House	Producer	ITV (LWT)	26 episodes
1969 - 1970	Hark at Barker	Producer	ITV (LWT)	15 episodes
1971	Doctor at Large	Producer/ Executive Producer	ITV (LWT)	29 episodes
1971	Six Dates with Barker	Producer	ITV (LWT)	6 episodes
1972 - 1973	Doctor in Charge	Producer	ITV (LWT)	43 episodes
1974	Doctor at Sea	Producer	ITV (LWT)	12 episodes
1974	The Top Secret Life of Edgar Briggs	Producer	ITV (LWT)	13 episodes
1974 - 1975	No, Honestly	Producer	ITV (LWT)	13 episodes
1975 - 1976	Lucky Feller	Producer	ITV (LWT)	14 episodes
1975 - 1977	Doctor on the Go	Producer	ITV (LWT)	26 episodes
1976	Maggie and Her	Producer	ITV (LWT)	Episode: "Poppy and Her"
1976 - 1977	Yes, Honestly	Producer	ITV (LWT)	26 episodes
1976 - 1979	Two's Company	Producer	ITV (LWT)	23 episodes
1979	Canned Laughter	Producer	ITV (LWT)	TV movie
1980	End of Part One	Producer	ITV (LWT)	7 episodes
1980	Peter Cook and Co.	Producer	ITV (LWT)	TV special
1980 - 1982	Nobody's Perfect	Producer	ITV (LWT)	14 episodes
1982	Whoops Apocalypse	Producer	ITV (LWT)	6 episodes
1983 - 1984	A Fine Romance	Executive Producer	ITV (LWT)	13 episodes
1983 - 1985	No Problem!	Executive Producer	Channel 4	27 episodes
1984	Dream Stuffing	Producer	Channel 4	10 episodes
1984	Me and My Girl	Executive Producer	ITV (LWT)	6 episodes
1985 - 1987	Relative Strangers	Producer	Channel 4	19 episodes
1986 - 1988	Hot Metal	Producer	ITV (LWT)	12 episodes
1988 - 1992	That's Love	Producer	ITV (TVS)	26 episodes
1988	Thompson	Producer	BBC	6 episodes
1989	Behaving Badly	Producer	Channel 4	4 episodes (mini-series)
1989	Look Back in Anger	Producer	Channel 4	TV movie
1989 - 1994	Desmond's	Producer/ Executive Producer	Channel 4	69 episodes
1989 - 1995	Surgical Spirit	Producer	ITV (Granada)	46 episodes
1990 - 1993	Up the Garden Path	Producer	ITV (Granada)	18 episodes
1993 - 1994	The Brighton Belles	Producer	ITV (Carlton)	11 episodes
1993 - 1994	Conjugal Rites	Producer	ITV (Granada)	13 episodes
1995	Agony Again	Producer	BBC	7 episodes
1995	Porkpie	Producer	Channel 4	6 episodes
1996 - 1998	Faith in the Future	Executive Producer	ITV (LWT)	15 episodes
1997 - 1998	Hale and Pace	Executive Producer	ITV (LWT)	14 episodes
1998	Duck Patrol	Executive Producer	ITV (LWT)	7 episodes
1999	Bostok's Cup	Executive Producer	ITV (LWT)	TV movie
1999	Spaced	Executive Producer	Channel 4	7 episodes
2003 - 2004	All About Me	Executive Producer	BBC	16 episodes
2005	Comedy Lab	Executive Producer	Channel 4	Episode: "Skin Deep"
2014 - 2016	Birds of a Feather	Producer	ITV	16 episodes
2016	Goodnight Sweetheart	Producer	BBC	Episode: "Many Happy Returns"
2018 - 2019	Hold the Sunset	Producer	BBC	13 episodes

== Inheritance ==
In 2000, Barclay was adopted into the royal family of Tafo, a village which is a three-hour drive north-west of Accra in the Kwahu region of Ghana, while there to attend the funeral of his friend, the actor Christopher (Gyearbuor) Asante. As a chief of the community, he now bears the title of Nana Kwadwo Ameyaw Gyearbuor Yiadom I, Nkosuohene of Kwahu-Tafo. Barclay is active in helping to raise funds for the community, which has had unemployment levels of more than 80 per cent. He has teamed up with Ikando Volunteers to help provide skilled volunteers to the community. He is in the line of descent of the Barclays of Mather and Urie, a Scottish lairdship.

He is a descendant of David Barclay of Youngsbury (1729–1809), a Quaker banker who famously manumitted all of the slaves he acquired in English Jamaica as the result of a debt. In 2016, through an introduction via Verene Shepherd, the Jamaican historian of diaspora studies, Humphrey Barclay met with a distinguished African American descendant of one of the slaves freed by his ancestor.
