= Lee Vanderbilt =

Trinidadian soul and funk singer

- Born: Kenrick Edgar Pitt; 9 August 1935 (age 91); San Fernando, Trinidad and Tobago
- Died: 19 February 2015 (aged 79); United Kingdom
- Occupations: Musician; singer
- Children: 4
- Musical career
- Genres: Funk; Soul; Disco

Lee Vanderbilt (9 August 1935 – 19 February 2015), born as Kenrick Edgar Pitt, was a Trinidadian soul and funk singer. Vanderbilt sometimes known under his aliases Kenrick Des-Etages and Ebony Keyes.

== Biography ==
Vanderbilt was born as Kenrick Edgar Pitt in San Fernando, Trinidad and in the late 1950s moved to the United Kingdom. At that point he changed his name to Kenrick Edgar Des-Etages. In 1964 Pitt signed his first record deal using the stage name, "Ebony Keyes", with Parlophone, releasing two songs, "Brother Joe" and "Under the Apple Tree".

In 1967, after an introduction from his friend Peter Gage (a founder of Geno Washington & The Ram Jam Band and Vinegar Joe), he signed to Pye Records where he released a number of singles through both their subsidiary record label Piccadilly Records and on the label of their primary Australian distributor, Astor Records.

In 1968, Pitt signed to the United Artists Records, and at the suggestion of an A&R executive, changed his stage name from Ebony Keyes to "Lee Vanderbilt". While with United Artists he took part in a number of recording sessions including the recording of "Some Girls Do", the theme song for the 1969 British spy-spoof of the same name. "Some Girls Do" was released by United Artists as a single in 1969. In the same year Vanderbilt was asked to represent the United Kingdom at the Gibraltar World Music Festival, where he won gold and bronze medals with two songs of his own composition, "How Shall I Know" and "A Woman's Way".

=== 1970s and onwards ===
In the 1970s, Vanderbilt was regularly in the studio, working as a session musician. Through his session work he met many artists with whom he would go on to collaborate including an aspiring musical arranger, producer and songwriter from India called Biddu Appaiah (also known simply as Biddu). Biddu and Vanderbilt became friends and collaborated for many years on a number of projects. In 1973, Biddu established his own production company to which he signed a number of artists, including Vanderbilt. The first commercially successful artist signed to Biddu's production company was Carl Douglas, who in 1974 released his well-known disco hit "Kung Fu Fighting". Carl Douglas also recorded three songs written by Lee Vanderbilt, "I Don't Care What the People Say" (Biddu-Vanderbilt), "Stand Up For Love" and "Never Had This Dream Before", all three of which appeared on his Kung Fu Fighter album in 1974.

In 1976, Vanderbilt introduced his friend Tina Charles to Biddu, who Biddu signed and for whom he produced a number of worldwide hits including a single released in 1976 called "I Love to Love". The B-side of that single was a song written by Vanderbilt called "Disco Fever". Tina Charles also recorded Vanderbilt's song "All Comes Back to You" on her 1976 album, Dance Little Lady. Jimmy James and the Vagabonds also signed to Biddu's production company. Jimmy James recorded a number of Vanderbilt's songs including: "Disco Fever", "Never Had This Dream Before", "Let's Have Fun", "Suspicious Love" (Biddu/Vanderbilt) and a fifth song called "If You Think that Funk is Junk Your Drunk". Biddu also had success with his own group known as the Biddu Orchestra. The Biddu Orchestra comprised a group of session musicians with whom Biddu and Vanderbilt had worked for many years. Biddu recorded two songs with the Biddu Orchestra written by Vanderbilt, "Funky Tropical" (which appeared both on his album Eastern Man and which he released as a single in 1977) and "Jump for Joy". Vanderbilt was also a backing vocalists for the Biddu Orchestra.

In 1977, Vanderbilt released his only album on the RCA Records, Get Into What You're In. The songs on the album reflected his many musical influences, including funk numbers such as "Funky Tropical" and "Show Me What You Made Off"; soulful love songs including "Coral Isle" and "Stand Up for Love"; and Caribbean-esque numbers "Sweet Ices" and "What a Way". The album was produced by Biddu with arrangement performed by the likes of Gerry Shury, Chris Karan, Rebop Kwaku Baah, Michael Moran. It did not achieve as much commercial success as it did critical acclaim.

In addition to releasing his own album, working with artists as a session singer and percussionist and collaborating with Biddu and the other artists signed to Biddu's production company, in the 1970s, Lee Vanderbilt performed a song, written by George Barrie and Sammy Cahn, called "The Night Has Many Eyes", for the 1973 film Night Watch starring Elizabeth Taylor and Laurence Harvey. The song was released as a single in 1973 on the Brut Record label. He wrote the theme music for the UK comedy movie Black Joy (performed by Jimmy Helms) released in 1977 and starring Norman Beaton, Trevor Thomas and Floella Benjamin; and wrote and performed "Lonely I" for the same movie. During the 1970s he also sang a number of well-known and award-winning television commercials, including the Martini Hot Air Balloon commercial; Tia Maria's "Get It Together" commercial; and one of Lilt's "Totally Tropical Taste" commercials.

Some other artists with whom Vanderbilt has worked are Edwyn Collins, Elkie Brooks, Joan Armatrading, George Chandler, Jimmy Helms, Jimmy Chambers, Anthony Moore, Barclay James Harvest, and Bryn Haworth.

=== Death ===
Lee Vanderbilt lived and worked in the United Kingdom until his death on 19 February 2015, from a severe bout of pneumonia. He had four sons: Gary Des-Etages and Christopher "Tambu" Herbert (recording artists); Gabrial Kennedy; and Simon Des-Etages (attorney).

== Discography ==
=== Album ===
- Get Into What You're In (1977)

=== Singles ===
- "Some Girls Do" (1969)
- "Baby I've Come Home" (1970)
- "The Night Has Many Eyes" (1973)
- "Ah! Michelle / Take My Wine" (1974)
- "It's Dawn Again" (1974)
- "Get Into What You're In / Funky Tropical" (1977)

=== Singles as Ebony Keyes ===
- "Sitting In A Ring" (1966)
- "Country Girl" (1967)
- "Cupid's House" (1967)
- "Sweet Mary Anne / Don't" (1967)
- "Brother Joe" (1971)
