= Porkpie (TV series) =

British TV sitcom spin-off

- Genre: Sitcom
- Created by: Trix Worrell
- Starring: Ram John Holder
- Country of origin: United Kingdom
- Original language: English
- No. of seasons: 2
- No. of episodes: 12

Production
- Executive producers: Al Mitchell; Humphrey Barclay
- Producers: Humphrey Barclay; Paulette Randall
- Camera setup: Multi-camera
- Running time: 30 minutes

Original release
- Network: Channel 4
- Release: 13 November 1995 – 26 September 1996

Related
- Desmond's

Porkpie is a British television sitcom that aired on Channel 4 from 13 November 1995 to 26 September 1996, starring Ram John Holder as Augustus "Porkpie" Grant. It was a spin-off from Desmond's, and featured several of the same characters.

== Plot ==
Following the end of the highly successful Desmond's, life in Peckham continues. In the first episode, after the reading of the will of his late friend Desmond Ambrose (Norman Beaton), Augustus "Porkpie" Grant, a former employee at the Ford Motor Company is now a lollipop man. He borrows a pound from Michael (Desmond's son) and buys a lottery ticket. The ticket turns out to be a winner and Porkpie (as he is always called by friends) suddenly finds himself with a fortune of ten million pounds. However, before he announces that he has won, he gives Michael a pound back, so he cannot have any claims to the money. He moves out of his flat into a house and also hires a chauffeur to drive him around in his new car, a Ford Escort (Porkpie explains that he bought one because "I always wanted one of these, I could never afford one, not even with the staff discount"). As time (and the series) move on, Porkpie goes through various situations and learns whom he can and cannot trust now he is a millionaire.

Porkpie kept several key characters from Desmond's, and in the first episode, Grant ("Porkpie") is seen standing outside the barbershop Desmond used to run, saying: "Desmond, since you died, it hasn't stopped raining. I know how much you used to say it can rain in England, and it's true. Must be one of two things: either a thousand angels weeping for you, or you having a good drink up in heaven and you spilling it all over the place."

== Series ==
Porkpie was first screened in 1995, with the last new episode being shown in 1996. It ran for 12 episodes. The first series aired on Mondays and the second and final series aired on Thursdays.

== Cast ==
- Augustus Neapolitan Cleveland "Porkpie" Grant (Ram John Holder) continued to work as a lollipop man, although not enjoying his job, struggling to make ends meet and unable to afford to pay his bills. Visiting the barbershop where his late best friend Desmond and his family used to live and work, Porkpie bumped into Desmond's eldest son Michael. Porkpie asked Michael if he could lend him a pound for his bus fare, which he did. Porkpie went to the local shop and bought a lottery ticket with the pound. He ended up winning the lottery, hitting the jackpot, winning ten million pounds.
- Michael Ambrose (Geff Francis) was the eldest son of Porkpie's late best friend Desmond and his wife Shirley. He was still working as a bank manager at the branch where he worked. Porkpie hired Michael as his financial advisor. Michael didn't agree with many of the choices Porkpie made when it came to spending his money.
- Gloria Ambrose (Kimberly Walker) was the only daughter of Porkpie's late best friend Desmond and his wife Shirley. Michael suggested that she visit Porkpie, as he was feeling lonely. It was revealed that she was still with her boyfriend Alex, as Porkpie asked her how he was. Gloria only appeared in the first episode.
- Sean Ambrose (Justin Pickett) was the youngest child of Porkpie's late best friend Desmond and his wife Shirley. He visited Porkpie with his sister Gloria on the night shortly before Porkpie found out he had won the lottery. It was revealed that Sean was still studying as Porkpie asked him how college was. Sean only appeared in the first episode.
- Amanda "Mandy" Ambrose (Matilda Thorpe) was Michael's wife. She used to work as Michael's PA at the bank before they were married. Michael blackmailed Porkpie into giving Mandy a job at the centre. Porkpie gave her the job as a waitress in the jerk chicken café in the centre with Leone, which she wasn't very happy with as she was expecting to be the art consultant or a restaurant manager. She often told Michael how much she wanted to become a mother although Michael kept insisting that he wasn't ready to become a father. Mandy made many efforts to conceive, including seeing a therapist.
- "Benji" Benjamin (Derek Griffiths) was a busker whom Porkpie met at the bus stop when he was on his way home after buying his lottery ticket. After Porkpie claimed his prize, he went to the pub, where he bumped into Benji again and informed him that he had won the lottery. Porkpie then asked Benji if he could do him a favour and visit Michael with him at the bank and to pretend that he was the one that lent him the pound that he used to buy his winning lottery ticket. Benji asked Porkpie if he could give him a job as payment for doing him the favor. Porkpie hired Benji as his driver and gave him a job as a barman at the centre that he opened in memory of his late friend Desmond.
- Leone (Llewella Gideon) was Porkpie's live-in maid and also had a job as a waitress at the centre. She was the niece of Porkpie's good friend Vince. She came from the island of St. Lucia. When Vince found out that Porkpie was still looking for a maid, he recommended her to him. Vince said: "Well, I have this niece just come straight from St. Lucia, cook the best peas and rice, this side of the Atlantic." It was later revealed that Vince lied about Leone being his niece and that she was actually the niece of the woman that puts him under heavy manners. The woman was never named or seen.
- Vince (Count Prince Miller) was a good friend of Porkpie's and a member of The Georgetown Dreamers, a band that Porkpie, Desmond and Bert played in when they were young. He was the drummer for the band. He used to work as a part-time assistant in Desmond's barbershop before moving on to become a bus conductor.
- Burt (Sol Raye) was an old friend of Porkpie's and had been a member of The Georgetown Dreamers, a band that Porkpie, Desmond and Vince played in when young.
- Mr. Lu (Ozzie Yue) and his wife bought the building of Desmond's old barbershop and turned it into a West Indian take-away. The old barbershop was only shown in the first episode and was not shown again even after it was turned into a West Indian take-away. Mr. Lu had stated that he and his wife had six daughters. His wife was only seen in the first episode but did not speak.
- Aloysius (Robbie Tucker) was the boy Porkpie met at the park when he was talking to his late friend Desmond about what he would have done with the old barbershop if he had won the lottery before it was sold. He walked up to Porkpie and said, "Hello, lollipop man, are you talking to yourself?"
- "Susu" Doreen (Mona Hammond) was Porkpie's dream girl. She was the younger sister of his dear friend Shirley. Susu turned up out of the blue from Jamaica on Valentine's Day, after finding out about Porkpie's Lottery win in the West Indian Times newspaper. She told Porkpie that she had married an Englishman back in the Caribbean so that she could come to England and marry him. Porkpie later found out that she had run away with all her husband's savings, sold his electric wheelchair and stolen his passport so that he could not go after her, and that she only came to England to marry him and claim half of his fortune.
- Davina (Jane How) was a wealthy, white, English lady whom Porkpie had met on his holiday to Guyana. She became good friends with him and they stayed in contact. She had a sister called Daphne.
- Written by: Trix Worrell
- Produced by: Humphrey Barclay and Paulette Randall
- Executive produced by: Al Mitchell and Trix Worrell
