= Gyearbuor Asante =

Ghanaian actor (1941–2000)

- Born: Frederick Christopher Kwabena Gyearbuor Asante Erskine; 4 November 1941; Accra, Ghana
- Died: 2 August 2000 (aged 58); Accra, Ghana
- Citizenship: Ghanaian
- Education: Mountview Theatre School
- Occupation: Actor
- Years active: 1972-1994
- Known for: Hazell, The Professionals, Ubu Roi, Local Hero, Desmond's

Frederick Christopher Kwabena Gyearbuor Asante Erskine (4 November 1941 – 2 August 2000) was a Ghanaian actor best remembered for his role in the Channel 4 situation comedy Desmond's, in which he played the role of Gambian mature student Matthew.

== Life and career ==
Born in Accra, Asante moved to the United Kingdom in 1967 and trained to be an actor at the Mountview Theatre School. A "Gyearbuor Asante Prize for Acting" was subsequently instituted at the academy following his death. He appeared in a number of British TV shows during the 1970s and 1980s, where he was billed as Christopher Asante. His credits included episodes of Space: 1999, Mind Your Language, Hazell and The Professionals as well as a TV performance of Ubu Roi in 1976. He also played the minister in the 1983 film Local Hero.

He came from a long line of chiefs of his hometown Kwahu Tafo but ruled himself out of carrying on the tradition in favour of pursuing a career in acting; the chieftaincy Asante was offered was taken up by his friend, television producer Humphrey Barclay.

He returned to Ghana in 1995 where he was made a Cultural Ambassador. He died in Accra, with his funeral held in his ancestral village of Tafo Kwahu.

== Selected Filmography ==
Year	Title	Role	Notes
1972	Adam Smith	Vernon	Episode #2.3
1972	Love Thy Neighbour	TV Repair Man	Episode: "Voodoo"
1973 - 1976	Crown Court	Colin Langham / Bode Solanke	4 episodes
1974	The Top Secret Life of Edgar Briggs	Ticket Collector	Episode: "The Contact"
1975	Doctor on the Go	Jones	Episode: "What's Op Doc?"
1976	The Expert	Thuo Kamuni	Episode: "Hour of the Snake"
1977	Space: 1999	Guard	Episode: "The Seance Spectre"
1977	The Strange Case of the End of Civilization as We Know It	African Delegate	Film
1978	Mind Your Language	Inspector Roger Kenyon	Episode: "The Inspector Calls"
1978	Mixed Blessings	Dr. Morgan	Episode: "We're Only Trying to Help"
1979	Bless Me, Father	Mr. Affram	Episode: "Father Neil's First Miracle"
1979	Hazell	Anderson	Episode: "Hazell Gets the Bird"
1979	Strangers	Harry	Episode: "The Wheeler Dealers"
1980	The Dogs of War	Geoffrey	Film
1980	Minder	Taxi Driver	Episode: "You Gotta Have Friends"
1980	The Professionals	Quentin	Episode: "Fugitive"
1983	Local Hero	Rev. Macpherson	Film
1983	Rumpole of the Bailey	Rupert Taboro	Episode: "Rumpole and the Golden Thread"
1986	ScreenPlay	Michael	Episode: "Drums Along Balmoral Drive"
1989 - 1994	Desmond's	Matthew	69 episodes
