= Sol Raye =

Guyanese cabaret musician (1936–2006)

- Born: Neville Marshall-Corbin; 1936; Christianburg, British Guiana
- Died: 31 March 2006 (aged 70); London, UK
- Occupations: Cabaret singer and composer
- Notable work: Bert in Desmond's

Neville Marshall-Corbin (1936 – 31 March 2006) was a Guyanese cabaret singer, composer and recording artist who moved to England in the 1960s and originally studied acting, performing with the English Stage Company. He was born in Christianburg, Guyana.

Raye came to England to learn acting, studying at the London Academy of Music and Dramatic Art

His singing style was reflective of Nat King Cole. A nine-time winner of the British TV talent contest Opportunity Knocks, he recorded such popular songs as "Mona Lisa", "How Sweet It Is", and "Come Home Love" and toured widely with his cabaret tribute show to Cole. He also starred in, produced and directed a television tribute to Cole, A Nightingale Sang, in 1985, in which he sang alongside the likes of Nina Simone, Will Gaines and Danny Williams. He was also an opening act for such performers as The Supremes and Eartha Kitt.

He was best known for the semi-regular role of Burt in the Black British sitcom Desmond's, as a member of The Georgetown Dreamers, a band that featured Desmond (Norman Beaton) and Raye's fellow real-life musicians Porkpie (Ram John Holder) and Vince (Count Prince Miller). Other television roles included an appearance in Runaway Bay, whilst also acted in a number of theatre productions.

Sol Raye was also the President of New Target Records, headquartered at 47c Queens Gate, London SW7 5JN.

His younger brother, Robert Corbin, is the current leader of the People's National Congress Reform (PNCR), the main Guyanese opposition political party.

Raye died in London on Friday, 31 March 2006 of prostate cancer following a ten-year battle with the disease. His brother Robert Corbin delivered the eulogy at his funeral.
