= Carmen Munroe =

Guyanese-born British retired actress (born 1932)

Dame Carmen Munroe DBE
- Born: Carmen Esme Steele; 12 November 1932 (age 94); New Amsterdam, Berbice, British Guiana
- Occupations: Television actor, film actor, writer
- Years active: 1962–2021
- Relatives: Daphne Steele (sister)

Dame Carmen Esme Munroe (born 12 November 1932) is a Guyanese-born British retired actress.

She made her West End stage debut in 1962 and has played an instrumental role in the development of black British theatre and representation on small screen. She has had high-profile roles on stage and television, perhaps best known from the British TV sitcom Desmond's as Shirley, wife of the eponymous barber played by Norman Beaton.

== Early life ==
Carmen Esme Steele was born on 12 November 1932 in New Amsterdam, Berbice, British Guiana, one of nine children. Her eldest sister Daphne Steele became the first Black Matron in the National Health Service in Britain. Her mother Maude was a piano teacher and her father worked as a pharmacist who travelled around the colony to work. Steele was educated at Enterprise High School. She emigrated to Britain in 1951, with her mother and sister Jeune, following her sister Daphne. After studying ophthalmic optics for a year then working as a librarian in Tooting, south London, in 1957 she began studying drama with a group based at the West Indian Students' Centre in Collingham Gardens, south-west London.

== Acting career ==
Munroe first appeared on the West End stage in 1962 at Wyndham's Theatre in Tennessee Williams’s Period of Adjustment, and had leading roles in later West End productions, such as Alun Owen’s There’ll Be Some Changes Made (1969), Jean Genet’s The Blacks (1970), and as Orinthia in George Bernard Shaw’s The Apple Cart (1970). She also acted in such plays as Lorraine Hansberry's A Raisin in the Sun, Alice Childress's Trouble in Mind and James Baldwin's The Amen Corner. She directed James Saunders' play Alas, Poor Fred for the Umoja Theatre and Remembrance by Derek Walcott at London's Arts Theatre in 1987.

Her work for television has encompassed being for a time a presenter of Play School as well as the BBC's lunchtime children's programme How Do You Do, and a wide variety of acting appearances. These include Fariah Neguib in the 1967 Doctor Who serial The Enemy of the World; Sister Frances Washington in General Hospital, in The Persuaders (1971), Barry Reckord's In the Beautiful Caribbean (BBC 1972), Alfred Fagon's Shakespeare Country (BBC 1973), The Fosters (LWT, 1976–77), Michael Abbensetts' Black Christmas (BBC, 1977), Mixed Blessings (1978–80), Horace Ové's A Hole in Babylon (BBC, 1979), and Caryl Phillips' The Hope and the Glory (BBC, 1984). Munroe became best known, however, for her regular appearances between 1989 and 1994 in the Channel 4 sitcom Desmond's (written by Trix Worrell) as Shirley, wife of the eponymous barber Desmond Ambrose, played by Norman Beaton.

Her film career included roles in Naked Evil (1966), All Neat in Black Stockings (1968) and The Chain (1984).

She is one of the founders of Talawa, the UK's leading black theatre company, which she established in 1985 together with Mona Hammond, Inigo Espegel and Yvonne Brewster.

In 1992, Munroe "gave an outstanding performance as Essie Robeson in a BBC play called A Song at Twilight".

In 2005/06, Munroe acted in a series of three African American plays at the Tricycle Theatre, Kilburn. The plays were Walk Hard, written by Abram Hill and directed by Nicolas Kent, followed by Gem of the Ocean, written by August Wilson and directed by Paulette Randall, in which Munroe acted in the role of Aunt Esther Tyler, and finally Lynn Nottage's Fabulation, directed by Indhu Rubasingham. In 2007, she acted in Allister Bain's play Catalysta at the Ovalhouse, directed by Robert Icke, receiving rave reviews for her performance as Eartha. In 2013, Munroe appeared in the CBBC children's comedy/drama show The Dumping Ground (sequel to Tracy Beaker Returns) as Gina's mother Hattie. In 2020, she made a guest appearance on Holby City as a therapist for Jac Naylor (Rosie Marcel)

== Awards ==
Munroe was appointed Officer of the Order of the British Empire (OBE) in the 2007 Birthday Honours and Dame Commander of the British Empire (DBE) in the 2025 New Year Honours, both for services to drama.
