= Daphne Steele =

Guyanese nurse (1927–2004)

- Born: 15 October 1927; Essequibo, British Guiana (now Guyana)
- Died: 23 July 2004 (aged 76); Ilkley, West Yorkshire
- Citizenship: British citizenship
- Occupation: Nurse
- Known for: First Black matron in the National Health Service
- Relatives: Carmen Munroe (sister)

Daphne Steele (15 October 1927 – 23 July 2004) was a Guyanese nurse and midwife who in 1964 became the first Black matron in the National Health Service.

== Early life ==
Daphne Adrianna Steele was born on 15 October 1927 in the region of Essequibo, British Guiana (now part of Guyana) as the eldest of nine children. Her younger sister Carmen Steele later became better known as the actress Carmen Munroe. Carmen was one of Britain's most successful black actresses, appearing in shows such as Doctor Who and Desmond's. She plated a significant role in the development of black theatre in Britain. Her mother Maude was a piano teacher and her father worked as a pharmacist who travelled around the colony to work. The family were sufficiently well off to be able to afford servants to clean the family house.

== Medical career ==
She underwent training in nursing and midwifery at the public hospital in Georgetown in 1945. She emigrated to the United Kingdom in 1951, immediately after the Korean War, as part of the British Government seeking to recruit people to the new National Health Service (NHS). Steele was part of a group that mass emigrated to the United Kingdom from the Caribbean during this time period, called the "Windrush Generation." The Windrush generation played a role in staffing the NHS. These individuals filled the shortages of nurses and healthcare workers in the NHS. Individuals in the Windrush generation were often denied jobs and housing. Most individuals from the Windrush Generation experienced adversity and racism in the United Kingdom. Steele was encouraged to emigrate to the United Kingdom by her friends, who had received scholarships for nurse training. The journey took 14 days, and she arrived in Plymouth, Devon. She was surprised when a white man took her luggage for her, as in her native country, white men only worked in managerial roles. Steele was placed on a fast-track scheme in St James' Hospital in Balham, South London. She found the discipline akin to being in the military, which extended to the nurses' home where she lived. However, Steele also witnessed the racism of white colleagues and from patients, but tried to be friendly to avoid this personally. She recalled being received with suspicion by natives, constantly being referred to as "you people." She later recalled that her Jamaican colleagues were skilled in "cussing" out particularly nasty patients. Steele remained diligent, and focused on her commitment to her studies. However, Steele describes working with white colleagues and patients as a learning opportunity and deemed it necessary to have a "mutual understanding" in the workplace. There was constant prejudice against black nurses and physicians and the desire to improve the workplace for them during the 1950's. Her mother and two sisters—Jeune, who was a nurse, and Carmen Munroe—joined Steele in UK. Steele qualified as a state registered nurse and then as a midwife in 1954.

She moved to the United States in 1955, where she worked at a hospital in New Jersey for five years, before moving back in 1960 to the UK, where she was stationed at RAF Brize Norton. She later moved to Manchester, where she was employed as a Deputy Matron at Doris Court, a nursing home. When it was announced that the home was closing, an Irish matron, Mary Walsh, suggested that Steele should also apply to become a matron. In 1964, Steele was appointed as matron at St. Winifred's Hospital in Ilkley, West Yorkshire. This was the first time that a Black person had been appointed as a matron anywhere in the NHS. The appointment made news worldwide, with Steele receiving around 350 letters from well-wishers. She replied to each letter which provided a return address. The position of matron was the highest clinical nursing role during this time period, with responsibilities of overseeing nursing staff and ensuring patient quality.

After the hospital closed in 1971, Steele worked at Wharfedale children's hospital in Menston, then trained to became a health visitor at Leeds University and continued to work in this role in Ilkley and Bingley until her retirement in 1987. Her sister Jeune recalled that "she never seemed to be off duty" as she was so often approached in the street for help and health advice.

== Later life ==
Following retirement, Steele volunteered for a variety of organizations, including Soroptimist International, becoming president of the Ilkley branch from 1976–7. She was vice-president of the Association of Guyanese Nurses and Allied Professionals UK (AGNAP). She was a devoted Methodist. In 2001, the Guyanese High Commissioner to the United Kingdom awarded Steele a certificate in recognition of her medical achievements. In 2002, Steele carried the Shipley relay baton for Queen Elizabeth II’s Golden Jubilee as part of the run up to the Commonwealth games in Manchester.

Steele died in Airedale General Hospital in Keighley on 23 July 2004 of complications following an operation. She was survived by her son Robert.

== Accolades ==
Historic England unveiled a plaque to commemorate Daphne Steele on 23 February 2024. Blue plaques are significant in London as they celebrate the connection between a significant person and a place. Individuals awarded a blue plaque have had an "important positive contribution to human welfare or happiness." The plaque was placed at 2 Crossbeck Road, Ilkey, West Yorkshire, and refers to Steele as a "Pioneering Black matron in the NHS."

An earlier blue plaque was put up by the Nubian Jak Community Trust and the Association of Guyanese Nurses and Allied Professionals, in order to commemorate Steele's time training in St. James Hospital in Balham, South London. This plaque describes Steele as "Britain's first NHS hospital matron of African descent."

== Legacy and commemoration ==
In her memory, AGNAP renamed their annual health talk in 2013 to the Daphne Steele Memorial Lecture.

To mark what would have been Steele's 91st birthday on 16 October 2018, a commemorative blue plaque organised by the Nubian Jak Community Trust was unveiled at St. James's Hospital, Balham, where she had trained when she first arrived in England. St George’s Hospital in Balham celebrates Daphne Steele Day on 16 October, her birthday.

In 2022, it was announced that the University of Huddersfield’s planned Health & Wellbeing Academy was to be named for Daphne Steele. The new building is destined to train more people to work in health related careers and is planned to open in September 2024.

In February 2024, Steele became the first person to be honoured outside London with a Historic England blue plaque, it was installed at Hillside Court, on the site of what was St Winifred's maternity home in Ilkley, West Yorkshire.
