= Playing Away =

1986 television film

- Genre: Comedy
- Written by: Caryl Phillips
- Directed by: Horace Ové
- Starring: Norman Beaton; Nicholas Farrell; Robert Urquhart
- Country of origin: United Kingdom
- Original language: English

Production
- Producer: Vijay Amarnani
- Running time: 100 minutes

Original release
- Release: 25 November 1986

Playing Away is a 1986 TV comedy film directed by Horace Ové, from a screenplay by Caryl Phillips.

== Premise ==
In the story, an English cricket team, fictitiously named "Sneddington" (based in Lavenham, Suffolk), invites a team of West Indian heritage based in Brixton (South London) to play a charity game in support of their "Third World Week." According to Screenonline, "The gentle comedy of manners and unexpected reversal of white and black stereotypes in Playing Away contrasts sharply with the stylistic experimentation and the militant denunciations of racial prejudice in director Horace Ové's earlier feature, Pressure (1975)."

== Reception ==
New York Times reviewer Vincent Canby called it "witty and wise without being seriously disturbing for a minute".

== Production ==
The cricket match scenes were filmed at Botany Bay Cricket Club in Enfield, London.

The film cost £924,000.

== Cast ==
- Norman Beaton
- Nicholas Farrell
- Brian Bovell
- Ross Kemp
- Gary Beadle
- Trevor Thomas
- Ram John Holder
- Bruce Purchase
- Joseph Marcell
- Patrick Holt
- Neil Morrissey
