= For Queen and Country =

- Theatrical release poster
- Directed by: Martin Stellman
- Written by: Martin Stellman; Trix Worrell
- Produced by: Tim Bevan
- Starring: Denzel Washington; George Baker; Amanda Redman; Dorian Healy; Geff Francis; Bruce Payne
- Cinematography: Richard Greatrex
- Edited by: Steve Singleton
- Music by: Michael Kamen
- Production companies: Zenith Productions Limited; Working Title
- Distributed by: United International Pictures (United Kingdom); Atlantic Entertainment Group (United States)
- Release dates: May 17, 1988 (Cannes); May 19, 1989 (United States)
- Running time: 105 minutes
- Countries: United Kingdom; United States
- Language: English
- Budget: $3.5 million
- Box office: $191,051 (US) £124,048 (UK)

For Queen and Country is a 1988 crime drama film co-written by Trix Worrell and Martin Stellman, directed by Martin Stellman and starring Denzel Washington, Dorian Healy, Bruce Payne, Amanda Redman, Sean Chapman and Graham McTavish. Filmed in Panavision, Washington stars as Reuben James, a Black British former paratrooper, who joined the British Army to escape the poverty of inner-city London; Reuben fights in the Falklands War, and upon returning home he finds that society both ignores and challenges him while trying to adjust to normal life.

At the time of its release For Queen and Country received mixed reviews and was a box office flop. In recent years the film has been reevaluated as a serious critique of Thatcherism and its socioeconomic effects on the UK in the 1980s.

== Plot ==
Reuben James, a Black British man born in Saint Lucia and raised in the United Kingdom, joins the army paratrooper regiment. In 1979, he is attacked by IRA militants while leaving a pub in Northern Ireland, and is saved by fellow soldier and Londoner "Fish". Later in 1982, Reuben and his friends Fish and Londoner Bob Harper fight in the Falkland Islands. There, Fish loses his leg. In 1988, Reuben leaves the army and returns to his poor London neighbourhood. Reuben's longtime friend Colin is now a kingpin, and offers to make Reuben a part of his drug dealing operation, but Reuben declines.

Fish is now a gambler who cheats on his Irish pregnant wife, Debbie. He and Reuben attempt to celebrate the latter's return to civilian life at a nightclub, but are turned away by the bouncer. The two then spend the night drinking at Fish's flat. Returning home, Reuben finds his flat being burgled by children Oscar and Hayley. Reuben threatens Oscar, who points out Hayley's flat. Hayley's mother, Stacey, is there and gets Reuben to leave. On his way out, Hayley comes home wearing Reuben's paratrooper beret, which he takes back. Stacey eventually finds Reuben's campaign medals and returns them to him.

Reuben begins to look for a civilian job, to no avail. Meanwhile, Fish wins a lot of money by gambling and buys two tickets to Paris. He plans to take Reuben with him as a thank-you for covering an earlier debt with Bob, who is now a policeman. Later, at a party on the estate, Reuben encounters Stacey; the two dance, and Reuben walks her home. En route, they are subjected to racist insults from officers. Reuben later returns to the party, which is raided by the police. Several of his friends, including a man named Lynford, get arrested, but Bob tells him not to get involved. The next morning, Debbie gives birth early. Reuben takes Fish to the hospital, and Fish gives him both tickets, saying that he will not be able to go.

Reuben takes Stacey and Hayley to a funfair; there, he asks Stacey to accompany him to Paris. Stacey agrees until she sees Reuben playing a shooting game. This brings back memories of Hayley's father, a gangster who kept guns in the house, including in Hayley's cot. Reuben comforts Stacey and says that he is done with guns. Stacey later offers to get Reuben a job driving a minicab. When they return to the estate, there is a commotion happening. Lynford has thrown a brick at a police car, killing Constable Harry. Detective Kilcoyne asks Reuben whether he knows anything, which he denies.

While preparing for the trip to Paris, Reuben applies for a new passport, but is rejected. Since he was born in St. Lucia, a change in British nationality law has stripped him of his citizenship. Disillusioned, Reuben agrees to work as "muscle" for Colin. Carrying a gun, he runs into Stacey. After discovering it, she leaves, furious. The police later arrest drug dealer Sadiq, whom Colin has set up with Reuben's help. Returning to the estate, Reuben gives Colin back his gun and quits. He later finds Fish distraught after Debbie has left him and taken the children to Ireland. Giving Fish money, Reuben tells him to go after her.

Knowing about the deal with Colin and Sadiq, Kilcoyne later threatens to send Reuben to jail unless he says who killed Harry. Reuben reluctantly gives up Lynford. Subsequently, wanting to leave behind his current life, Reuben gets a St Lucian passport and a ticket to St Lucia. Meanwhile, Lynford and others gather weapons, preparing to fight the police. From a walkway, someone throws a Molotov cocktail, starting a riot.

With his bag packed, Reuben runs into Fish in the lift. They later find Lynford hiding from police on the ground floor. Racist policeman Challoner and another officer then appear. Challoner panics and shoots Fish dead; Kilcoyne then runs in. Distraught, Reuben goes to Fish's flat to retrieve his rifle. As the riot subsides, he shoots Challoner dead. Reuben soon gets in the sights of a hesitant police sniper, who is actually Bob. After being ordered to take the shot, Bob fires.

== Cast ==
- Denzel Washington as Reuben James
- Dorian Healy as Fish
- Bruce Payne as Colin
- Amanda Redman as Stacey
- Sean Chapman as Bob Harper
- Graham McTavish as Lieutenant
- Geff Francis as Lynford
- Frank Harper as Mickey
- Craig Fairbrass as Challoner
- Michael Bray as Bryant
- George Baker as Kilcoyne
- Stella Gonet as Debbie
- Colin Thomas as Feargal
- Ken Stott as Civil Servant
- Brian McDermott as Harry
- Jimmi Harkishin as Sadiq

== Production ==
For Queen and Country marked Martin Stellman's theatrical feature film directorial debut and writer Trix Worrell's first theatrical feature after penning a TV movie. Worrell said the character "Reuben James" was inspired by a friend's struggles to readjust to civilian life after serving in the Falklands War, with the decision to make him St. Lucian stemming from Worrell's own background from St. Lucia and concerns over his British citizenship. Producer Tim Bevan clarified that Denzel Washington's casting was not due to a lack of suitable black British actors but rather a strategic move aimed at the American market, with Atlantic Pictures contributing the majority of the $3.5 million budget after Washington's involvement.

Principal photography was set to commence on October 12, 1987. To prepare for the role, Washington immersed himself in East End London life, residing with a mixed-race working-class family to perfect his Cockney accent, and even hired a chauffeur fluent in the dialect to transport him to set. Legal disputes arose when Zenith Productions filed a lawsuit against AEG Acquisition Corporation, alleging breach of a distribution agreement encompassing For Queen and Country, Patty Hearst (1988), and The Wolves of Willoughby Chase (1989). Despite AEG's failure to fulfill payment obligations for the films, they purportedly sold television rights without Zenith's consent. Despite AEG's bankruptcy, they eventually agreed in February 1989 to pay $1 million for distribution rights to each film. Zenith sought an injunction against future broadcasts of the films and unspecified damages.

== Release and reception ==
The film was shown at the Marché du Film in Cannes on May 17, 1988. It received acclaim at the Taormina Film Fest and was shown at the closing gala at the London Film Festival on November 27, 1988. It opened in 33 theaters in North America, grossing $62,771 during the opening weekend. It went on to gross a total $191,051. It was released on DVD on June 1, 2004.

=== Critical response ===
Film aggregator site Rotten Tomatoes gave the film a 29% rating and an average rating of 5.4/10 based on fourteen reviews. Leonard Maltin described the film as a "striking, laced-in-acid contemporary thriller of life in Thatcherite Britain".

=== Accolades ===
Awards
| Award | Category | Recipients and nominees | Result |
|---|---|---|---|
| Festival du Film Policier de Cognac | Best Actor | Denzel Washington | Won |
| Festival du Film Policier de Cognac | Audience Award | Martin Stellman | Won |
