= Geff Francis =

British actor (born 1964)

- Born: Geffrey Francis; 1964 (age 61–62); England
- Occupations: Film and television actor

Geffrey Francis (born 1964) is an English actor. In 1986, he appeared as the title character in Channel Four's Zastrozzi, A Romance and in a minor role in The Singing Detective. He portrayed Lynford in the drama film For Queen and Country (1988). In the popular Channel 4 Peckham-set comedy series Desmond's (1989–94) he played the title character's eldest son (Michael), before later moving on to reprising his role in the spin-off series Porkpie (1995–96).

Francis has since become a regular character actor on British television. He portrayed the Metropolitan Police desk sergeant Viv James in the BBC TV series Ashes to Ashes. He also appeared in "The Bells of Saint John", a 2013 episode of fellow BBC TV series Doctor Who.

To science fiction fans, Francis is known as Admiral Frantis Griss, a minor antagonist in Star Wars: Episode IX – The Rise of Skywalker, the 2019 final instalment of the Star Wars sequel trilogy.

== Selected Filmography ==
Year	Title	Role	Notes
1986	The Singing Detective	Porter	6 episodes
1986	Zastrozzi, A Romance	Zastrozzi	4 episodes
1987	Bust	Baines	Episode: "Selling a Dummy"
1987	Rockliffe's Babies	Brinsley Harper	Episode: "Up the Down Escalator"
1988	For Queen and Country	Lynford	Film
1989 - 1994	Desmond's	Michael Ambrose	55 episodes
1990	South of the Border	Marcus	2 episodes
1991	Boon	Stan	Episode: "The Night Before Christmas"
1992	The Upper Hand	Jim	Episode: "Pillow Talk"
1995	The Governor	John Udding	3 episodes
1995	Porkpie	Michael Ambrose	11 episodes
1996	Sharman	Teddy	Episode: "Take the Train"
1998	Dangerfield	Alan Mason	Episode: "Silence Has Got Rhythm Too"
1998	Maisie Raine	Joseph Evans	Episode: "Food of Love"
2003	Roger Roger	Mack	3 episodes
2004	Bad Girls	Rick Revoir	3 episodes
2004	Blue Murder	Alec Arrowsmith	Episode: "Up in Smoke"
2004	Murder City	DI Adrian Dumfries	6 episodes
2004	Red Cap	Sgt. Lennie Raeburn	Episode: "Fighting Fit"
2005	Waking the Dead	Dr. Donald McNeil	Episode: "Black Run" (2 parts)
2006	Green Wing	Pimp	1 episode
2007	New Tricks	Louis Johnson	Episode: "Buried Treasure"
2007	Robin Hood	Smith	Episode: "Childhood"
2008 - 2010	Ashes to Ashes	Viv James	22 episodes
2013	Doctor Who	George	Episode: "The Bells of Saint John"
2015	Death in Paradise	Hank Laymon	1 episode
2015	The Dumping Ground	Dave	Episode: "It's Not All About the Money"
2017	Endeavour	Grantly Smalls	Episode: "Game"
2019	EastEnders	DS Todd	1 episode
2019	Killing Eve	John	Episode: "I Hope You Like Missionary!"
2019	Star Wars: Episode IX – The Rise of Skywalker	Admiral Frantis Griss	Film
2022	Midsomer Murders	Billy Bevan	Episode: "The Debt of Lies"
2022	Murder in Provence	Francois Roussel	3 episodes
2023	The Buccaneers	Sir Helmsley Thwarte	Episode: "American Poison"
2023	Carnival Row	Admiral Nevin	Episode: "New Dawn"
2023	Such Brave Girls	Mark	Episode: "Such Unavailable Girls"
2025	Missing You	Harvey Fox	2 episodes
