= Michael J. Ellis =

British playwright

Michael J Ellis also known as Michael Ellis is a British playwright noted for a series of stage works produced at a time when the representation of black and ethnic minority experience on the British stage was expanding and exploring new ground. In an article exploring the black writing of the eighties The Guardian noted: ‘one might have expected a rush of theatrical writing about growing up black in Britain. Both Michael Ellis (Chameleon, 1985, Temporary Rupture, 1989) and Tunde Ikoli (Scrape Off the Black, 1981), wrote about these experiences.’

Ellis’ stage plays include ‘Chameleon,’ ‘Temporary Rupture’ and ‘Bitter and Twisted’ he also works as a television scriptwriter with credits including Desmonds, EastEnders, South of the Border and ‘The Real McCoy.’ 'Chameleon' is arguably his best known work presenting a story of a black manager in a white run company verbally sparring with his black secretary, the manager following a pattern of obedience to the corporate line, the secretary more militant and their arguments highlighting issues of black identity in the UK in the 1980s. Discussing Ellis' work of the period Bruce Alvin King noted; 'his plays and their places of publication participate in the black consciousness of the time.' Ellis' work continues to form part of courses on drama and post-colonial writing in UK universities.

== List of works ==
- Black Plays ISBN 978-0-413-15710-2
- Chameleon (Temba, 1985) ISBN 0-413-15710-5
- Temporary Rupture (Black Theatre Co-op, 1988)
