= Martin Stellman =

British screenwriter and director

Martin Stellman (London, 28 July 1948) is a British screenwriter and director best known for creating and writing The Interpreter (2005), starring Nicole Kidman and Sean Penn, and co-writing with Franc Roddam the 1979 British cult classic Quadrophenia.

He attended Bristol University, before joining the psychedelic band Principal Edwards Magic Theatre and is a graduate of the National Film and Television School. He often collaborates with British screenwriter and director Brian Ward.

He wrote and directed the action thriller For Queen and Country (1988) starring Denzel Washington playing a Falklands War veteran. He teamed up with Idris Elba, co-writing Yardie (2018), Elba's feature debut. Elba took inspiration from Stellman's earlier film Babylon (1980), a drama about sound-system culture in London during the 1970s.

== Filmography ==
=== Writer ===
- Yardie (2018)
- The Interpreter (2005)
- Shoebox Zoo (TV series, 3 episodes) (2004)
- Tabloid (2001)
- For Queen and Country (1988)
- Defence of the Realm (1986)
- Babylon (1980)
- Quadrophenia (1979)

=== Director ===
- Harry (TV series, 3 episodes) (1993)
- For Queen and Country (1988)
