= The Top Secret Life of Edgar Briggs =

British ITV sitcom (1974)

- Genre: Comedy
- Written by: Bernard McKenna; Richard Laing
- Directed by: Bryan Izzard; Bruce Gowers
- Starring: David Jason; Noel Coleman; Michael Stainton
- Theme music composer: Sam Fonteyn
- Opening theme: "Defective Detective"
- No. of seasons: 1
- No. of episodes: 13

Production
- Producer: Humphrey Barclay
- Production company: London Weekend

Original release
- Network: ITV
- Release: 15 September – 20 December 1974

The Top Secret Life of Edgar Briggs is a 1974 British television comedy series created by Bernard McKenna and Richard Laing and produced by Humphrey Barclay for LWT. It was directed by Brian Izzard/Bruce Gowers and starred David Jason as the inept Edgar Briggs, personal assistant to the Commander of the British Secret Intelligence Service who, in spite of his cluelessness, manages to solve case after case. It ran for one series of 13 25-minute episodes on the ITV network.

In 2026 the series was shown on the British TV channel Rewind TV.

== Cast ==
- David Jason as Edgar Briggs
- Noel Coleman as The Commander
- Michael Stainton as Buxton
- Mark Eden as Spencer
- Barbara Angell as Jennifer Briggs
- Elizabeth Counsell as Cathy

== Episodes ==
Episode #	Episode title
1-01	The Assassin
1-02	The Defector
1-03	The Leak
1-04	The Escape Route
1-05	The Abduction
1-06	The Exchange
1-07	The Courier
1-08	The KGB
1-09	The Traitor
1-10	The Drawing
1-11	The President
1-12	The Appointment
1-13	The Contact

== Reception ==
According to David Jason's biographers, Edgar Briggs was not a ratings success in Britain but proved popular in overseas markets. Nevertheless, Jason reportedly vetoed repeat screenings of the series for many years on the grounds that he "[knew] how raw he looked in those days" and was "not at all anxious to share that with his public."

== DVD release ==
The complete series was released on DVD in March 2015.
