= Al Mitchell =

American football player (1897–1967)

No. 15
- Position: Tackle

Personal information
- Born: August 30, 1897; Greenville, Pennsylvania, U.S.
- Died: May 12, 1967 (aged 69); Livonia, New York, U.S.
- Listed height: 6 ft 1 in (1.85 m)
- Listed weight: 180 lb (82 kg)

Career information
- High school: Greenville (PA)
- College: Thiel

Career history
- Buffalo Bisons (1924)
- Stats at Pro Football Reference

Albert Edwin Mitchell (August 30, 1897 – May 12, 1967) was an American professional football player for the Buffalo Bisons, playing six games in 1924. He went to Thiel College. He was born in Greenville, Pennsylvania. He was a tackle, a center and an end. He died in Livonia, New York.
