= Ram John Holder =

Guyanese actor and musician (born 1934)

Ram John Holder CBE
- Born: John Wesley Holder; 2 February 1934 (age 92); Georgetown, Guyana
- Occupation: Actor
- Known for: Porkpie in Desmond's
- Relatives: Frank Holder (cousin)

John Wesley Holder (born 2 February 1934), known professionally as Ram John Holder, is a Guyanese-British actor and musician, who began his professional career as a singer in New York City, before moving to England in 1962. He has performed on stage and in both film and television, the latter of which he is best known for playing Augustus "Porkpie" Grant in the Channel 4 sitcom Desmond's and in its spin-off series Porkpie.

== Early life ==
Holder's parents were devout members of the USA-based Pilgrim Holiness Church. He grew up in Georgetown, Guyana, during the 1940s and 1950s. Influenced by the church and the musical talents of his parents, he became quite accomplished playing the guitar. During the early 1950s, the strict, strait-laced church membership was scandalised when he broke away and changed his name to "Ram" John. Holder began to perform as a folk singer in New York City.

== Acting career ==
In 1962, Holder arrived in London and worked with Pearl Connor's Negro Theatre Workshop initially as a musician, and later as an actor. Holder performed at several London theatres, including the National Theatre, the Donmar Warehouse and Bristol Old Vic.

His first major film role was as the effeminate dancer Marcus in Ted Kotcheff's film Two Gentlemen Sharing (1969), which told the story of interracial relations in swinging London. John Boorman then cast Holder as the black preacher in the comedy film Leo the Last (1970), also about race relations, which was set in a Notting Hill slum in West London. Holder also sang the songs in the film. He again played a preacher in the Horace Ové-directed film Pressure (1975), made a cameo performance in My Beautiful Laundrette (1985) as a poet, and appeared in Sankofa Film and Video's debut feature The Passion of Remembrance (1986). His other film roles included appearances in Britannia Hospital (1982), Half Moon Street (1986), Playing Away (1987), Virtual Sexuality (1999), Lucky Break (2001) and as a Jamaican barber in The Calcium Kid (2004).

Holder played the role of Augustus "Porkpie" Grant in the situation comedy Desmond's, which was written by Trix Worrell, and broadcast on Channel 4 from 1989 until 1994. Holder later had his own short-lived spin-off series Porkpie. Porkpie was considered one of the most popular characters in Desmond's, and although the spinoff series was short-lived, it was credited with extending the black British presence in the comedy genre.

Holder joined the cast of EastEnders in late September 2006, playing Cedric Lucas. His last stage performance to date was as Slow Drag in the 2006 revival of August Wilson's Ma Rainey's Black Bottom at the Royal Exchange Theatre in Manchester. In 2017, Holder appeared in an episode of Death in Paradise as Nelson Myers, the estranged father of main character PC Dwayne Myers (played by Danny John-Jules). Holder reprised his role for three episodes the following year, as well as in the Christmas Special in December 2024.

He has also appeared as 'Flying' Freddie Mercer in episodes of the BBC Television children's programme The Story of Tracy Beaker. In May 2008, he appeared in an episode of the BBC drama The Invisibles. He is seen in an ensemble part in Song for Marion, a feature film from Paul Andrew Williams, the director of London to Brighton, starring Vanessa Redgrave and Terence Stamp.

Holder appeared in the 2022 film Your Christmas or Mine?, and its sequel, Your Christmas or Mine 2 in 2023.

In November 2023, Holder joined the cast of Coronation Street, playing Ernest "Sarge" Bailey until his departure in January 2024.

== Music career ==
Holder has continued his dual career as a musician. He has recorded the albums Black London Blues (1969), Bootleg Blues (1971), You Simply Are... (1975) and Ram Blues & Soul, as well as various singles and contributed to soundtracks for film and television. He contributed three songs for the film adaptation of Take a Girl Like You (1970). He recorded the vocals for theme tune of the 2026 series 15 of Death in Paradise, which played on the 2025 Christmas special and the 2026 series finale.

== Honours ==
Holder was appointed Commander of the Order of the British Empire (CBE) in the 2021 Birthday Honours for services to drama and music.

== Personal life ==
Ram John Holder is the cousin of the jazz vocalist Frank Holder.

== Discography ==
Albums

- Blues+Gospel+Soul (Melodisc Records, 1963)
- Black London Blues (Beacon Records, 1969)
- Bootleg Blues (Beacon Records, 1971)
- You Simply Are... (Fresh Air, 1975)

Singles

- "I Need Somebody" (B Side: "She's Alright"), Columbia, 1967
- "My Friend Jones" (B Side: "It Won't Be Long Before I Love You"), Columbia, 1967
- "I Just Came To Get My Baby" (B Side: "Yes I Do"), Beacon, 1968
- "Goodwill To All Mankind" (B Side: "Goodwill Sermon"), Upfront, 1969
- "Battering Ram, The People's Man" (B Side: "A London Ghetto"), Fresh Air, 1973
- "Battering Ram" (B Side: "London Ghetto"), Fresh Air, 1975

== See also ==
- Desmond's
- Down to Earth
- List of Black Britons
- List of EastEnders characters
- Porkpie
