= The Fosters (British TV series) =

British television series

- The Fosters cast
- Created by: Jon Watkins
- Based on: Good Times by Mike Evans and Eric Monte
- Developed by: Jon Watkins
- Starring: Norman Beaton; Isabelle Lucas; Carmen Munroe; Sharon Rosita; Lawrie Mark; Lenny Henry
- Country of origin: United Kingdom
- Original language: English
- No. of series: 2
- No. of episodes: 27

Production
- Production locations: South London, England
- Running time: 22 minutes
- Production company: London Weekend Television

Original release
- Network: ITV
- Release: 9 April 1976 – 9 July 1977

Related
- Good Times

The Fosters is a British television show, produced by London Weekend Television, which aired on ITV from 9 April 1976 until 9 July 1977.

It was created by Jon Watkins and was the first British sitcom to feature an entirely black cast. The show was based on the American sitcom Good Times, adapted by Watkins and developed by Norman Lear. The series starred Norman Beaton as Samuel Foster, and also featured Lenny Henry in his first regular TV role. The Fosters ran for two series, with a total of 27 episodes. The show's final episode was broadcast on 9 July 1977.

== Overview ==
The Fosters is a British television sitcom that aired on ITV from 1976 to 1977. Created by Jon Watkins, the series was based on the American sitcom Good Times, developed by Norman Lear, Eric Monte, and Mike Evans. The Fosters featured an all-black cast, one of the first British television shows to do so, and paved the way for future series such as The Real McCoy, No Problem!, Desmond's and The Lenny Henry Show. The show starred Norman Beaton as Samuel Foster, a hard-working man supporting his family in a South London council flat, and Isabelle Lucas as his wife, Pearl. Other cast members included Carmen Munroe, Lenny Henry, Sharon Rosita, and Lawrie Mark. The show ran for two series and produced 27 episodes before its final broadcast on 9 July 1977.

The pop singer Linda Lewis appeared in the "Take Your Partners" episode in season 2.

== Cast ==
- Norman Beaton as Samuel Foster
- Isabelle Lucas as Pearl Foster
- Carmen Munroe as Vilma
- Lenny Henry as Sonny Foster
- Sharon Rosita as Shirley Foster
- Lawrie Mark as Benjamin Foster

== Episodes ==
Series	Episodes	Originally released	
Series	Episodes	First released	Last released
1	13	9 April 1976	2 July 1976
New Year Special		1 January 1977	
2	13	16 April 1977	9 July 1977

=== Series 1 (1976) ===
No. overall	No. in series	Title	Original release date
1	1	"Sex and the Black Community"	9 April 1976
2	2	"My Son the Lover"	16 April 1976
3	3	"God's Business Is Good Business"	23 April 1976
4	4	"The Check Up"	30 April 1976
5	5	"Black Jesus"	7 May 1976
6	6	"The Man I Most Admire"	14 May 1976
7	7	"Situations Vacant"	21 May 1976
8	8	"Sonny Gets a Patron"	28 May 1976
9	9	"Buy Now, Pay Later"	4 June 1976
10	10	"The Windfall"	11 June 1976
11	11	"Over the Hill"	18 June 1976
12	12	"The Matchmaker"	25 June 1976
13	13	"Benjamin's Rebellion"	2 July 1976

=== New Year Special (1977) ===
No.	Title	Original release date
14	"New Year with the Fosters"	1 January 1977

=== Series 2 (1977) ===
No. overall	No. in series	Title	Original release date
15	1	"The Nude"	16 April 1977
16	2	"Up In Arms"	23 April 1977
17	3	"Give a Little Whistle"	30 April 1977
18	4	"Take Your Partners"	7 May 1977
19	5	"That Lovely Weekend"	14 May 1977
20	6	"The Family Business"	21 May 1977
21	7	"The Bargain"	28 May 1977
22	8	"The Diet"	4 June 1977
23	9	"Home and Away"	11 June 1977
24	10	"Who Needs Friends?"	18 June 1977
25	11	"That's My Boy"	25 June 1977
26	12	"The Family Way"	2 July 1977
27	13	"The House Guest"	9 July 1977

== DVD release ==
DVD	Release date
The Complete Series 1	5 July 2010
The Complete Series 2	5 September 2011
