= Trix Worrell =

Saint Lucian-British writer and director (born 1959)

Trix Worrell (born 1959) is a Saint Lucian-born British writer, composer and director best known as the creator and writer of television sitcoms Desmond's and Porkpie for Channel 4. His son is actor Elliot Barnes-Worrell.

== Biography ==
Worrell started as a theatre writer and director. He went on to create the Albany Basement Theatre Company and has written and directed plays in most of the leading London fringe theatres from Upstairs at the Royal Court to Ovalhouse. A graduate of the National Film and Television School, and winner of Channel 4's "Debut" writers competition, Worrell went on to create, write and direct Desmond's and Porkpie for Channel 4 and What You Looking At for London Weekend Television.

He has written the scripts for several award ceremonies, including MTV Europe Awards for Ali G in Frankfurt, for P Diddy in Barcelona, the MOBO Awards and the BBC2 Windrush Ceremony. Worrell directed an internet drama entitled Dog Endz, and the critically acclaimed one-woman show Little Big Woman, starring Llewella Gideon, at Leicester Square Theatre. He has also taught in three of the most highly established film schools in Europe; at the NFTS in the UK, La Fémis in Paris, and Lodz in Poland.

Screen credits include For Queen and Country which was produced by Working Title Films and directed by Martin Stellman and which starred Denzel Washington, Amanda Redman and Sean Chapman.

Worrell started Wicked Films and Trijbits & Worrell with his business partner Paul Trijbits. They opened up offices in Los Angeles and went on to work with New Line Cinema, Fox, Universal, Disney, ABC, Carsey-Werner, Whoopi Goldberg, The Cosby Show and Ridley Scott. His company produced and developed a number of films; among the most notable are:

- The Young Americans, written and directed by Danny Cannon and starring Harvey Kietel, Vigo Mortessen, Thandiwe Newton and Iain Glen.
- Roseanna’s Grave, directed by Paul Weiland and starring Jean Reno and Mercedes Ruehl.
- Hardware, directed by Richard Stanley and starring Dylan McDermott.

Worrell is a BAFTA nominee, British Comedy and the Royal Television Society award winner. He is a recipient of the Lifetime Achievement Award from the Royal Television Society.. He is the first recipient of "Vantage", a special award presented at BAFTA by Screen Nation. Worrell was made an honorary member of the British Comedy Academy in 2011.

He was also voted one of the "100 Great Black Britons Throughout History" by the Daily Mail. An excerpt from Desmond's was used in the opening ceremony of the London 2012 Olympic Games.

Worrell is currently working on his first novel, Brown Skins in the Rain, a coming-of-age comedy set in 1969; and a children's illustrated book set in Hastings called Sea Dogs.

In 2016, Worrell served as an Artistic Associate Producer on the short film The Works, written and directed by his son Elliot Barnes-Worrell and starring Ralph Fiennes and Sharon D. Clarke, produced by Lisa Osborne. He subsequently founded Distant Voices, a Stevenage-based community media project and creative hub designed to support emerging local talent, mentor underrepresented voices, and provide pathways into television and film writing. Worrell has also taught and lectured at major European film schools, including the National Film and Television School (NFTS) in the UK, La Fémis in Paris, and the National Film School in Łódź, Poland.
