= Norman Beaton =

Guyanese actor (1934–1994)

- Born: Norman Lugard Beaton; 31 October 1934; Georgetown, British Guiana
- Died: 13 December 1994 (aged 60); Georgetown, Guyana
- Occupation: Actor
- Years active: 1970–94
- Television: Desmond Ambrose in Desmond's

Norman Lugard Beaton (31 October 1934 – 13 December 1994) was a Guyanese actor long resident in the United Kingdom. He became best known for his role as Desmond Ambrose in the Channel Four television comedy series Desmond's. The writer Stephen Bourne has called him "the most influential and highly regarded black British actor of his time".

== Early life ==
Beaton was born in Georgetown, British Guiana (now Guyana). He attended Queen's College, and went on to a teacher training college, where he received high marks, and served as the deputy headmaster at Cane Grove Anglican School in Demerara.

Beaton taught and played with the calypso band The Four Bees before leaving Guyana for London in 1960. There, he attended London University, and taught briefly in Liverpool as the first black teacher in the Liverpool Education Authority before giving up on teaching to take on the acting profession.

== Early career ==
Beaton developed a parallel career as a calypso singer, scoring a number-one hit in Trinidad and Tobago with "Come Back Melvina" in 1959. He then obtained a post in the shipping department of a bookshop until his wife and children arrived in London in 1960. He then became a teacher in Liverpool, becoming the first black teacher to be employed by the Liverpool Education Authority. While in the city, he played guitar for Adrian Henri, Brian Patten and Roger McGough – who became known as the Liverpool Poets – including appearances at the Cavern Club. Beaton became increasingly unhappy with his work as a teacher and began writing plays, his first play being the musical Jack of Spades, which was about the doomed relationship between a black man and a white woman, quite controversial at that time. The moderate success of this play gave Beaton enough confidence to give up teaching and to concentrate on the theatre. He moved first to Bristol and then to Sussex where he played the leading role in a musical he had written, Sit Down, Banna, at the Connaught Theatre. This was the beginning of his acting career.

== Acting career ==
In the early 1970s, Beaton began to perform in plays in London's West End. In 1970 he played the role of Ariel in Shakespeare's The Tempest, which he described in his autobiography as "the most important role of my acting career", and also played a small role in the Frankie Howerd comedy film Up the Chastity Belt the following year. In 1975, he helped to establish the Black Theatre of Brixton. In 1975, Beaton played Nanki-Poo in The Black Mikado, a modern version of Gilbert and Sullivan's The Mikado.

In 1976, Beaton broke into television in the series The Fosters, which also featured a young Lenny Henry, and the following year played the lead role in a low-budget independent film about a West Indian community in London, Black Joy, for his role in which he was named Film Actor of the Year in 1978 by the Variety Club of Great Britain. He also appeared in the BBC TV series Empire Road (written by Michael Abbensetts).

However, it was Beaton's six-year run (from 1988) in the Channel Four television comedy series Desmond's (written by Trix Worrell), as the title character Desmond Ambrose, that would become his best-known role. For Desmond's he received the Royal Television Society Best Comedy Performer Award.

He played the lead role of Willie Boy in the 1987 TV comedy Playing Away (directed by Horace Ové, from a screenplay by Caryl Phillips), about a West Indian cricket team invited to play a rural white team. Beaton also appeared in several movies, including The Mighty Quinn (1989). He appeared as a guest on The Cosby Show in 1991 (episode: "There's Still No Joy in Mudville"), and in the 1994 television serial Little Napoleons.

His autobiography, Beaton But Unbowed, was published in 1986.

== Death ==
On 13 December 1994, after years of working hard taking a toll on his health, Beaton retired to his home city of Georgetown, Guyana (just as his character in Desmond's was doing the same), where he collapsed at the airport from a heart attack and died a few hours later on 13 December 1994 at the age of 60. He was survived by five children from three marriages.

It was announced in Porkpie – the spin-off series to Desmond's – that Beaton's character, Desmond, had died approximately 11 months before the spin-off's first episode.

== Personal life ==
Beaton was married and divorced three times, and had four children with his first wife – two children born in Guyana, two in the UK – and one child with his second wife. Norman spent many years living in Brixton with Jane Cash, whom he referred to as "the wife he never had". Jane died in 2020. He married Jean Davenport in 1988, but they separated later. She died in 2001.

== Legacy ==
BBC Radio Drama have founded the Norman Beaton Fellowship (NBF) to "broaden the range of actors available to Radio Drama producers across the UK by encouraging applicants from non-traditional training backgrounds".
