= Andrew Warrington =

- Family Affairs character
- Portrayed by: Simon Cook
- Duration: 2000–2001
In-universe information
- Occupation: Doctor
- Wife: Luisa Warrington (backstory); Nikki Warrington (until 2001)
- Sons: Luke Warrington
- Daughters: Sara Warrington
- Stepsons: Darren Scott
- Stepdaughters: Becky Scott

Andrew Warrington is a fictional character from the British soap opera Family Affairs, played by Simon Cook. He first appeared onscreen in 2000 and departed the following year after producers decided to write the character out of the show.

== Development ==
Andrew is characterised as an intelligent and loving family man. Cook told Alison James from Soaplife that "basically he's an intelligent, responsible man who wants the best for the people he loves. He cares deeply for his family. Unfortunately, these feelings don't seem to be reciprocated by certain members."

Andrew arrives in Charnham as part of the new Warrington family. It consists of his two children Sara (Beth Cordingly) and Luke Warrington (Royce Cronin), wife Nikki Warrington (Rebecca Blake) and her teenage children Becky Scott (Chandra Reugg) and Darren Scott (Joe Fox). Nikki begins an affair with Luke. Blake who plays Nikki described Andrew as "a very straight guy" who could not imagine a bigger betrayal than his son and wife having an affair. Their tryst is discovered by Nikki's ex-husband Adrian Scott (Ariyon Bakare) and he takes Becky and Darren away in exchange for his silence. Cook explained that Andrew becomes suspicious of Nikki following the children going to live with Adrian. He confronts Nikki and she admits to having an affair. But her lies continue as she claims her lover is a colleague. Nikki's admission leaves the character devastated but willing to save his marriage. But he does want revenge against her. Cook stated "there's no way he intends to just forgive and forget. He can't resist making bitchy comments. The way he sees it, he wants to make her pay."

But Sara decides her father needs to know the truth and sets Nikki and Luke up. Andrew catches them in bed together which destroys him emotionally. Cook believed that his character experienced "utter devastation" and numbness because the betrayal came from both his wife and son. Andrew feels "terribly hurt" and thinks that his family view him as a fool. Though he blames Nikki entirely for the affair because she is eleven years Luke's senior. Cook added "Andrew feels that she corrupted his son for the sake of a sordid little affair and completely abandoned her responsibilities."

The decision was made by producers to write Andrew out of the show following the cumulation of the storyline. They believed that Andrew would not be able to live on the same street as Nikki. Cook was upset to leave the role but agreed with their decision. He also noted that the character never fitted into the show because he was "relatively normal".
