= Luke Warrington =

- Family Affairs character
- Portrayed by: Royce Cronin
- Duration: 2000–2002
- First appearance: 31 January 2000
- Last appearance: 3 May 2002
In-universe information
- Occupation: Waiter
- Father: Andrew Warrington
- Mother: Luisa Warrington
- Stepmother: Nikki Warrington
- Brothers: Darren Scott (Step)
- Sisters: Sara Warrington; Becky Scott (Step)

Luke Warrington is a fictional character from the British soap opera Family Affairs, played by Royce Cronin. The character debuted on-screen on 31 January 2000 and departed on 3 May 2002.

== Development ==
Nikki arrives in Charnham with his father Andrew (Simon Cook) step-mother Nikki (Rebecca Blake), sister Sara (Beth Cordingly) and step siblings Becky (Chandra Reugg) and Darren Scott (Joe Fox). He develops feelings for Nikki and they begin an affair. But Nikki's ex-husband Adrian Scott (Ariyon Bakare) soon learns of their affair. So Luke decides to go to university in Scotland. When he next sees Nikki they sleep together despite vowing not too.

Blake told Diana Hollingsworth from Soaplife that "there's a strong sexual chemistry between Nikki and Luke, but I think she's actually fallen in love with him now." But their affair would destroy the Warrington family due to the nuclear family they worked hard to build. Blake added "It would blow the family apart completely. He's a very straight guy - I don't think he could envisage a bigger betrayal. It couldn't be worse." Blake observed that Nikki only gave into their attraction when she consumed alcohol.

Their affair is later discovered by Sara. She decides the truth must out and Andrew catches them in bed together. Cook said that his character was in a numb state of "utter devastation" as the betrayal came from his son and wife. Andrew thinks his family see him as a fool. Though he blames Nikki entirely for the affair because she is eleven years Luke's senior. Cook added "Andrew feels that she corrupted his son for the sake of a sordid little affair and completely abandoned her responsibilities." But Andrew also feels foolish as he treated Luke as his confidant when he suspected Nikki of infidelity. Cook added "it never crossed his mind that his wife would be making out with his son."

== Storylines ==
Luke first arrived in Charnham in January 2000 with his father, Andrew, his sister Sara, their stepmother Nikki, and step-siblings Darren and Becky. Luke quickly landed work at the Cybercafe and dated local barmaid Siobhan Jones for a while.

In the summer of 2000 Luke and his stepmother Nikki began a sordid love affair which they struggled to keep secret from the rest of the family. The secret was exposed at Christmas 2000 and tore the family apart. Luke and Nikki remained together a short time after this but ended the relationship when Luke went travelling.

In December 2001 Luke returned to Charnham in search of Sara, and this time began a romance with former stepsister Becky. This romance did not last long and Luke eventually left Charnham for good.

== Reception ==
Di Hollingsworth of Soaplife said that Luke was one of "the great seducers" of soap opera and gave him a home wrecker rating of two out of five.
