= Nikki Warrington =

British soap opera fictional character

- Family Affairs character
- Portrayed by: Rebecca Blake
- Duration: 2000–2003
- First appearance: 31 January 2000
- Last appearance: 1 December 2003
In-universe information
- Occupation: Cafe Manager
- Brothers: Matt Ellis
- Husband: Adrian Scott (1989-1995); Andrew Warrington (1999-2001); Roy Farmer (2003)
- Sons: Darren Scott
- Daughters: Becky Scott
- Stepsons: Luke Warrington
- Stepdaughters: Sara Warrington

Nikki Warrington is a fictional character from the British soap opera Family Affairs, played by Rebecca Blake. She first appeared on-screen during the episode broadcast 31 January 2000. She last appeared on 1 December 2003. The character arrived as part of the Warrington/Scott family and has been labeled a "serial adulterer" due to her many affairs. Arriving with husband Andrew Warrington (Simon Cook), she has an affair with his son Luke Warrington (Royce Cronin). She is unfaithful to Luke with her ex-husband Adrian Scott (Ariyon Bakare) and later Jim Webb (Jo Dow). Nikki later finds love once again and marries Roy Farmer (Miles Petit). Her affair with Luke earned her the title of the "wicked stepmother" from Soaplife magazine.

== Development ==
=== Characterisation ===
So here's to you, Nikki Warrington, people love / hate you more than you will know. Woah, woah, oh… dear. Yes, Nikki Warrington certainly has a street divided – with family and friends on both sides. She's never been lucky in love. Two ex-husbands and an affair with her step son later it might just be time for Nikki's luck to change!

— five.tv on Nikki.

A writer from five.tv described Nikki as one to always cause controversy. She is equally loved and hated by her neighbours for her behaviour. She is also the peacemaker and always there to mediate her children's many arguments. The wardrobe department kitted Nikki out with a plain dress code. Blake told Susan Riley of Soaplife that "Nikki's clothes are slowly getting trendier but she's very dowdy. When I used to see how frumpy I looked on-screen, I'd hotfoot it down to wardrobe and try to lose a few of her outfits." When Blake first joined the show she was styling a shorter hair cut. But while filming her hair would drop over her face and Blake believed it made Nikki look like a muppet.

=== Affair with Luke ===
Nikki arrives in Charnham with her children Becky Scott (Chandra Reugg) and Darren Scott (Joe Fox). She is accompanied by her husband Andrew Warrington (Simon Cook) and his grown up children Sara Warrington (Beth Cordingly) and Luke Warrington (Royce Cronin). Though an attraction develops with the latter and they begin an affair. Blake defended her character's actions by noting that Nikki only ever acted on her feelings for Luke following alcohol consumption. Nikki's ex-husband Adrian Scott (Ariyon Bakare) is introduced into the show and he learns of their affair. Blake told Diana Hollingsworth from Soaplife that "Nikki can't bear for the children to find out that she slept with Luke. She doesn't want to decimate the family set-up she's worked so hard to create. And Andrew is very much part of that package." Adrian uses his knowledge of the affair into forcing her to let him take Becky and Darren away. But Blake explained that Nikki believes that Adrian will not be able to support them and will return them home. She then blames their departure on Andrew's family problems. But the deceit and her children's absence proves too much for the character. Blake stated "She's blown to pieces, utterly destroyed [...] Nikki is distraught. She keeps breaking down and is finding it very hard to hold everything together."

Becky is miserable living with Adrian and runs away to visit Luke at university. Nikki goes to collect her but ends up sleeping with Luke despite the trouble their affair already created. This was because the duo have a "strong sexual chemistry". Blake also believed that Nikki had fallen in love with Luke. But she remains determined to stay with Andrew. Blake reasoned that "It would blow the family apart completely. He's a very straight guy – I don't think he could envisage a bigger betrayal. It couldn't be worse."

Andrew begins to suspect an affair when he returns from an American lecture tour. He is suspicious of Adrian taking the children and demands answers. Nikki lies to Andrew claiming she has been unfaithful with a colleague. Andrew is angry with Nikki but also willing to save their marriage. Cook told Alison James of Soaplife that "he still loves Nikki and wants to make a go of things. But he doesn't make it easy for her. there's no way he intends to just forgive and forget." Luke confesses to Sara that he is Nikki's lover. However Sara realises that Nikki will continue sleeping with Luke and makes sure Andrew catches them having sex. Cook believed that it was the ultimate betrayal from his wife and son. The shock leaves him numb and devastated. Andrew blames Nikki and believes that she corrupted her own son for an affair. Cook added that Nikki "completely abandoned her responsibilities". Cook thought that Nikki's reasons for wanting to remain with Andrew were selfish. He added "Nikki's desperate to save it, probably because she'll lose everything – a sizeable income and her kids." Cook said there was no hope of Nikki and Andrew repairing their relationship. Producers decided to write Andrew out of the show. They realised that Andrew could not live on the same street as Nikki.

=== Affair with Adrian ===
"Nikki has such a pleasant, almost mumsy demeanor that somehow you don't really see her as a serial adulterer. But having cheated on the father, she's now about to do the dirty on the son as well."

— Soaplife on Nikki's serial infidelity. (2001)

Nikki faces trouble at home when her son Darren (Ike Hamilton) refuses to accept her relationship with Luke. He decides to behave rudely and hope it pushes Nikki closer to Adrian. His plan succeeds when Nikki comforts Adrian after he decides to search for a man who sexually assaulted him. The emotional moment results in them sleeping together. Blake told James that "Nikki's fond of Adrian, but she's moved on and regards him as a kind of brother. She ended up making love with him because it felt kind of normal." Blake said that Nikki views it as a one off because it did not rekindle her old feelings for Adrian.

But Adrian presumes that they can become a family again. Blake said that her character worries and wants to stop Adrian from believing they have a future. Though Blake noted that Luke did not play a part in her decision to rebuff Adrian. She believed that Nikki and Luke did not work as a couple. It is a fantasy for Nikki, they have no future and she does not see him as a father figure. Blake believed that Luke would have been ideal for Nikki when she was younger, but she chose to be a mum instead. Blake came to the conclusion that her character needed to live her lost adolescence to finally grow up. She added that she is "trying to relive her lost youth. I'd like to see her hand the kids over to Adrian for a while and get those wild oats out of her system once and for all!" Luke soon discovers Nikki and Adrian's affair.

== Reception ==
Hollingsworth branded Nikki "Charnham's wicked stepmum" for sleeping with Luke. While she later added "Nikki Warrington gave the term 'wicked stepmother' a whole new meaning when she fell into the arm's of her husband Andrew's son." Their colleague Alison Riley said that Nikki's life was a "right mess". A reporter from the Birmingham Mail said that Nikki had a confusing "tangled love life" which was made worse by sleeping with Adrian. A Soaplife reporter included Nikki and Luke at number two in their soap opera "toy boys" storyline feature.
