= List of Family Affairs characters =

This is a list of characters from the British soap opera Family Affairs listed in alphabetical order by the characters' surnames.

== A ==
- Scarlett Anderson

Scarlett Anderson was played by Cat Simmons during 2005. She seduces Les Boulter (Howard Saddler), but he tells her it was a mistake.

- Caleb Andrews

Caleb Andrews was played by Steve Toussaint in 2004 and appeared as a series regular. He is Les's best friend and Denise Boulter's (Clare Perkins) love interest. He takes an HIV test, the results of which are negative.

It is revealed that he is Brendan Boulter's (Steven Burrell) biological father. Caleb tries to restart his affair with Denise, but she chooses Les. Caleb shares a kiss with Eileen Callan (Rosie Rowell), whose husband, Pete Callan (David Easter), is sent back to prison for murder. Caleb leaves Charnham because Eileen's daughter, Lucy Day (Julie Smith), witnesses the kiss and threatens to tell Pete.

- Gavin Arnold

Gavin Arnold was played by Neil Roberts and made his first appearance in 2001. Roberts was a newcomer to the soap opera genre and was signed to the show's regular cast.

- Polly Arnold

Polly Arnold was played by Juliet Cowan from January 2000 to July 2001.

- Tanya Ayuba

Tanya Ayuba was played by Laila Rouass between 2000 and 2001; it was Rouass' first role on British television. The character is a doctor, and appears on a recurring basis. Ten years after she left the show, Rouass claimed she was still recognized as Tanya.

Tanya's boyfriend Gavin Arnold (Neil Roberts) asks her to move in. She feels that their relationship is moving too fast, and is curious about his relationship with his estranged wife Imogen. Tanya finds Imogen's address and goes to see her, resulting in a "disastrous visit".

== B ==
=== Cheryl Barker ===
Cheryl Barker was played by Cathy Murphy between 2003 and 2004. She is in a live-in relationship with Dave Matthews (Richard Hawley), which sometimes causes tensions given his propensity to sometimes operate outside the law, alongside his feud with slimy publican Pete Callan (David Easter).

=== Madge Bennet ===
Madge Bennet was played by Heather Chasen, and appeared in 5 episodes in 2005.

=== Brendan Boulter ===
Brendan Boulter was played by Steven Burrell between autumn 2003 and November 2004.

Brendan was a closeted bisexual. He began a relationship with Melanie Costello (Rebecca Hunter) and they became engaged. Mel was unaware that Brendan was having an affair with Sean Steel (Sam Barriscale). At Brendan and Mel's engagement party, Brendan confessed that he was bisexual, devastating Mel who dumped him after outing him. After much coaxing, Mel decided to go to New York City with Brendan, who had originally bought the tickets as an engagement present. Upon their return, Brendan and Mel surprised their families by announcing they had gotten married while in New York. Not long after, Brendan began an affair with a man named Jason, which Melanie found out during Brendan's niece, Suzie's, christening. She decided to end their relationship permanently and Brendan left Charnham in November 2004.

=== Denise Boulter ===
Denise, along with her husband Les and children Brendan and Kelly move onto Stanley Street in December 2003 shortly after Roy Farmer's (Miles Petit) death in the cybercafé fire. She and Les purchase the corner café and 16 Stanley Street from Nikki Farmer (Rebecca Blake), turning the former into a restaurant and moving the family into the latter. Caleb Andrews (Steve Toussaint) is employed to work in the restaurant as a cook.

Denise initially tries to keep secret about an affair she had with Caleb, and that Brendan is actually Caleb's son. Denise and Caleb resume their affair, but quickly end it when Denise realises she loves Les, though he finds out about the affair afterwards.

During her time on Stanley Street, Denise builds up strong friendships with Cat MacKenzie (Nicola Duffett), Chrissy Costello (Kazia Pelka), Eileen Callan (Rosie Rowell), and Cheryl Barker (Cathy Murphy). The five of them form a pub darts team.

While walking home one night in December 2004, Denise is raped by an unidentified assailant. Les immediately suspects Christian Habgood, Denise's tutor at Charnham College. However, when she enters Graham Harker's (Lee Warburton) cab, Denise suspects him of the crime based only on her recollections of the smell of his aftershave and his usage of the phrase "Scout's honour". The police question Harker, but no forensic evidence is found to link him to the crime, and they are forced to release him due to lack of evidence. Denise persists with her desire to see him arrested, and eventually learns the true identity of her attacker.

Shortly after, Denise discovers that Les had gone to see prostitutes on a number of occasions. Marriage counselling is unsuccessful, and they split. In late 2005, Denise moves away. Her daughter Kelly and granddaughter Suzie later join her.

Denise was portrayed by Claire Perkins.

=== Kelly Boulter ===
Kelly Boulter, played by Carryl Thomas, made her first appearance in October 2003 and departed in August 2005.

Kelly first appears in Charnham in October 2003 dating Benji McHugh (Mark McClean). She has also been sleeping with Justin MacKenzie (Ryan Davenport). When Kelly becomes pregnant with twins, there is some doubt over the babies' father's identity, who is revealed to be Justin. Despite Benji's warnings to take things easy, Kelly begins drinking and is later hospitalized. In the hospital, doctors reveal Kelly lost one of the twins. Benji leaves Charnham afterwards.

Kelly's family, particularly Les and Brendan, do not care for Justin, as they liked Benji. However, Denise is prepared to give Justin the benefit of the doubt. After the Boulters settle into the area and purchase the corner cafe previously owned by Roy, Kelly becomes friends with local teenage girls Lucy Day (Julie Smith) and Melanie Costello (Rebecca Hunter).

In July 2004, Kelly gives birth to a baby girl, Suzie, named after Justin's mother. Justin and Kelly later became engaged. Throughout the rest of the year, Kelly is involved in several family dramas, including Brendan's divorce to Melanie after learning that Brendan is bisexual, and Denise's rape.

In early 2005, Kelly and Justin are horrified when they are accused of abusing Suzie after she suffers severe head injuries. The Boulters and MacKenzies are under surveillance from social workers for several months until a judge at a hearing is satisfied that nobody was at fault, but orders a review every three months.

In August 2005, after Denise leaves Les, Kelly leaves Charnham after she discovers Justin sleeping with Scarlet Anderson (Cat Simmons), and she joins Denise with Suzie.

=== Les Boulter ===
Lester "Les" Boulter, played by Howard Saddler, made his first appearance in November 2003. He departed in August 2005.

Les first appeared in Charnham in November 2003, shortly after he and Denise hear the news that their daughter Kelly is pregnant. Just before Christmas, Les and Denise move into the area and began running their own cafe on the site of the previous cybercafé that had been destroyed in a fire, resulting in Roy's death.

Les initially dislikes Kelly's boyfriend, Justin MacKenzie (Ryan Davenport), but eventually warms up to him.

During the first few months of 2004, Denise has been having an affair with Caleb. Les finds out but eventually forgives Denise. He later learns Brendan isn't his son, but Brendan reassures Les that he considered him his dad. Les becomes jealous of Denise spending so much time with her tutor at Charnahm College, Christian Habgood. One night in December, Denise is raped while walking through an alleyway.

When Graham moves into Stanley Street, Denise immediately recognizes his voice. After months of high drama and Graham's arrest for kidnapping Denise and holding her daughter-in-law Melanie (Rebecca Hunter) against her will in his flat, Les and Denise try to get things back to normal but the damage has been done.

Les begins seeing prostitutes on two occasions, despite hesitating. Les is arrested one day and fined. Afterwards, Les and Denise separate.

Les sells the corner café to Marc MacKenzie (Graham Bryan) and moves up to Liverpool, leaving Justin in charge of renting his house.

=== Conor Byrne ===
Conor Byrne was played by Glenn Mulhern. He is Declan's brother, and is a resident in Charnham for several months in 2000.

=== Declan Byrne ===
Declan Byrne was played by Quentin Jones between 1999 and 2001.

Declan shared a flat with Clive Starr (Huw Bevan) and Gabby Johnson (Emma Linley). He dated Gabby, but was unaware that Clive had fallen in love with him. Declan was straight and rejected Clive. He became friends with Josh Matthews (Terry Burns) and later dated his estranged wife Yasmin (Ebony Thomas).

== C ==
=== Eileen Callan ===
Eileen Callan (née Day) was played by Rosie Rowell from 2002 until the final episode in 2005.

=== Pete Callan ===
Peter "Pete" Callan was played by David Easter from September 1997 until the character was killed off in September 2005. As Maria Simons's (Annie Miles) callous former husband he is disliked by most of her friends: the Hart and Gates families, and their associates. Nevertheless, he takes over running local bar restaurant The Lock where they all regularly hang out. In an attempt to force Pete out of The Lock, Maria hires two thugs to threaten him into leaving. They beat him up and leave him in a coma, but he remains in Charnham. Pete develops an enmity with Roy Farmer (Miles Petit) and later develops similar rivalries with his employee Josh Matthews (Terry Burns) and Josh's father Dave (Richard Hawley).

In 1998, Pete starts dating Claire Toomey (Tina Hall) and they soon get married. He bonds with her twin children Ewan and Stella, although he is violent towards Claire. In January 1999, a mentally unbalanced Roy kidnaps and threatens to murder Claire. When Claire defends Roy, Pete beats her and she leaves Charnham. Pete becomes close to Julie-Ann Jones (Chloe Howman) and almost sleeps with her. Julie-Ann's mother realises what could have happened and informs Pete that he is Julie-Ann's father. Easter told Sue Malins from Soaplife that "Pete always regrets that Julie-Ann came into his life a fully grown woman and that he missed out on her childhood years."

Pete begins a brief relationship with Dave's ex-wife Cat Matthews (Nicola Duffett). Pete goes into a de facto marriage to Cat for several months, but it is revealed to have been a con perpetrated by Pete to exact revenge on Dave, and to swindle Cat out of her home; he convinces her to sign over ownership of her home to him as a formality to expedite a business transaction. After this was done he reveals the con to her, ends the relationship, and keeps the house. Soon after this Cat finds out she is pregnant. Tests show the child to be Pete's. She gives birth to a son David (nicknamed Davie). Pete is annoyed when Cat puts Dave as David Jr's father on his birth certificate. Pete decides he will be more successful in a custody battle if he is also married, and he decides on family friend Siobhan Jones (Jemma Walker). Easter explained that "he realises that he has to find a partner so he can present himself as part of a stable relationship equipped to raise a child." Easter believed that Pete targets Siobhan despite being aware that she is vulnerable. But she had always called him "Uncle Pete" and viewed him as a friend. As the storyline progresses he proposes to her. Easter added that "despite being completely calculating in the beginning"; Pete proposes marriage out of genuine love.

Pete enters into a rivalry with Josh over Siobhan's affections. After selling The Lock and buying The Black Swan, Pete's employs Josh as a barman to pay off a debt. Josh realises Pete's marriage with Siobhan is bigamous, though they legally remarry. During a showdown at The Black Swann, Pete murders Josh and frames Siobhan for the crime. She is found guilty and given a suspended sentence. Soon after the trial she realises that Pete had framed her. She aborts their child and walks out on him. He never forgives her.

Claire returns and clashes with Pete. She blackmails him when she discovers his part in Josh's death, and uses the money to buy a share of the cybercafé. When Pete is acquitted of Josh's murder, he uses that to proposition her into giving him her shares of the cafe. Claire offers him 5% of her shares. She dates his rival Tom Shackleford (Tom Healy). Pete has a vendetta against the Shacklefords and forces George Shackleford (Miles Anderson) out of Charnham, when he finds out he is cheating on Pete's sister Diane Short (Pooky Quesnel) with Claire. Pete romances Tom's ex-wife Kate Matherson (Mary Stockley) and becomes a surrogate father to her and Tom's daughter, Harriet, much to Tom's annoyance. Their feud escalates and Pete accidentally causes a car accident that kills Kate and leaves Siobhan infertile.

Pete begins a relationship with Charlotte Day (Leanne Lakey). She later proposes to him despite allegations that he has slept with Claire. Following advice from Siobhan that Charlotte may be his final chance of happiness, Pete decides to accept. However, Charlotte sleeps with Pete's nemesis Johnny Palmer (Iain Fletcher) multiple times. Pete learns of their affair and sets a trap. Claire has a fling with Johnny and they conspire to get revenge on Pete by faking Claire's death and framing Pete for her murder. Pete finds out and confronts Claire. She trashes her house to make it seem like Pete had broken in and murdered her. However the plan was ruined by Ben Galloway (Peter England). Claire continues to hide and fake her death, whilst Johnny blackmails Pete into giving him The Black Swan Pub. Johnny betrays Claire by revealing her whereabouts to Pete, forcing her to return. She leaves Charnham permanently.

Pete enters into a rocky relationship with Charlotte's mother Eileen (Rosie Rowell) in December 2002. They briefly separate when Eileen sleeps with her daughter Lucy's (Julie Smith) boyfriend Jake Walker (Seb Castang). As revenge Pete sleeps with Lucy and humiliates her, causing her to attempt suicide. Pete is unaware that Eileen has formulated a plan with her former boyfriend Mike Shaw (Tony O'Callaghan) to marry Pete so she can divorce him and take half of his money, and have him put away for arson as revenge. Mike sets fire to the cybercafe in September 2003, which kills Roy whilst he is saving his wife, Nikki Farmer (Rebecca Blake). Pete is arrested on his and Eileen's wedding day in December 2003, which occurs on the same day as Roy's funeral. After spending several months in prison, he returns after being acquitted at his trial in June 2004. He returns to discover Lucy murdering Mike in order to protect Eileen and helps them to dump Mike's body at a footbridge. Pete, however, discovers Eileen's true colours when her enemy Trish Wallace (Gabrielle Glaister) provides him with the tape of Eileen confessing to framing him for arson, which culminates in Pete throwing Eileen in the River Thames on their first wedding anniversary, after playing the tape back to her.

After a brief fling with Katie Williams (Robyn Page), Pete and Eileen realize they love each other and reunite. In summer 2005, Trish returns heavily pregnant with Pete's baby, which delights him as he had always wanted a baby with Eileen but Eileen had suffered several miscarriages. She has a son, Thomas, but on his christening in September 2005, Trish appears upstairs at the pub with a gun and holds Pete, Eileen and Katie hostage. Pete manages to wrestle the gun away from Trish and shoots her with it. Worse is to come when S019 officers storm the pub and order Pete to drop the gun. After an emotional moment with Eileen, Pete takes a shot at the police and is shot dead by the armed officers. In his will, Pete leaves nothing to Eileen but gives everything to his two sons, Davie and Thomas. To repay Pete for this, Eileen flushes his ashes down the toilet.

A reporter from Soaplife observed that "nearly every woman who walks into this soap seems to walk into his arms – and is soon made to regret it".

A Soaplife writer said "Charlotte and Pete's relationship is proving more elastic than a pair of Cat's leopard-skin leggings. But, unlike the aforementioned garment, it seems to be holding up very well, despite much outside interference." Beth Hart from Digital Spy believed that Pete had met his match in Charlotte because she kept him "on his toes" since they met. Hart later branded him "Charnham's arch manipulator". Soaplife's Di Hollingsworth said "Pete Callan's a cunning, devious charmer who manages to smile that evil smile of his even when he's delivering the nastiest threat imaginable. Women don't seem able to resist falling at his feet." The writer later opined that "Pete's a guy totally without morals. Combine that with oodles of sex appeal and you've got a deadly cocktail, one that Pete serves up when he needs to get his own way. He can turn on the charm like a tap, and he frequently does." Columnist Emma Pomfret observed "Pete Callan's love life is about as savory as one of Fred Elliott's best tripe pies."

Pete came 7th in a poll to find the most-hated soap villains.

=== David Cash ===
David Cash was played by James Gaddas. The character is a solicitor, boss, and briefly a love interest of Holly Hart.

=== Chloe Costello ===
Chloe Costello was played by Leah Coombes from September 2003 until the end of the series in 2005.

=== Chrissy Costello ===
Christine (Chrissy) Costello (née Maxwell) was played by Kazia Pelka from 2003 until the end of the series in 2005.

=== Gary Costello ===
Gary Costello was played by Gary Webster from 2003 until the end of the series in 2005. Gary first arrives in Charnham in September 2003 after purchasing Number 12 Stanley Street from Jim Webb and his family who had recently moved to Spain. Gary had lost his job in Chigwell and was forced to move his wife Chrissy and their daughters Melanie and Chloe to Charnham. A short while later, Gary's mother Myra moves over from Spain to live with the family. Gary enters into a partnership with Dave and together they set up a business called Gaz n' Dave's, a minicab firm.

Later that year, Chrissy takes Chloe to the doctors and tells Gary that Chloe had been diagnosed with cancer. This later turned out to be a lie, resulting in Chrissy's subsequent arrest; she had been scamming the local residents into starting a collection for Chloe. Gary and Chrissy's marriage go through numerous problems and they separate for a while. In October 2004, Melanie's ex-boyfriend, Bradley Foster, who had lodged with the Costellos for several months, is accused of sexually abusing Chloe, which leads to a fierce showdown on Bonfire Night when Gary wants a confession and Bradley begins goading Gary about how Chloe would not leave him alone. Gary punches Bradley, knocking him out. Gary is held in custody for assault and Bradley, upon receiving a retina operation, is arraigned with him after being charged with possession of indecent images. Both are subsequently released on bail. On Christmas Eve 2004, Gary proposes to Chrissy to remarry him and she accepts. Gary stands trial in Spring 2005 for the assault on Bradley, and is found not guilty.

Shortly afterwards, Gary and Chrissy remarry. In May 2005, Melanie runs away after a failed relationship with Graham Harker, who is revealed to be Denise's rapist. Gary begins to struggle with the cab business when Dave leaves for Scotland. In the final week of the series, Mel returns home and Gary welcomes her back, and Chrissy eventually warms up to Mel's return. In the final episode, Eileen reveals she had a win on the lottery and bought a house in Chigwell and one next door for the Costellos.

=== Melanie Costello ===
Melanie Costello (formerly Boulter) was played by Rebecca Hunter from September 2003 until May 2005. She returned for the final week of the series in December 2005. Melanie first arrives in Charnham in September 2003, along with her parents Gary and Chrissy, and her 8-year-old sister Chloe. Gary had lost his job and the family were forced to move from a mansion in Chigwell into 12 Stanley Street which had recently been vacated by Jim Webb, his sister Karen, Karen's husband Matt, and their daughter, Grace.

Mel struggles to adjust to life in Charnham. Her boyfriend, Bradley had gone travelling to Australia and Melanie finds it difficult to get work. Melanie tries the local pub, The Black Swan, but is rejected after her new friend Lucy Day mentions to Pete that she is underage. Melanie manages to work for Roy Farmer at the cybercafe. Mel briefly experiments with drugs and offers her friend Lewis Davenport some pills, who has an adverse reaction and collapses. Lewis assures Mel that he took the pills of his own accord. Chloe later discovers the pills and ingests one causing her to fall comatose. She recovers, and Gary forgives Mel, but Chrissy does not at first. At the end of 2003, Mel begins dating Brendan. During a dinner at the Costellos, Chrissy talks non-stop about Mel's previous boyfriend Bradley; she makes it clear that she is not happy with Mel dating Brendan, who she hardly knows. Despite Mel continues seeing Brendan, unaware that he is living a double life.

After suspicions from Eileen, which are later confirmed by local nurse Tanya Woods, Chrissy is exposed for lying about Chloe having cancer, and is arrested. Melanie is later held in custody after taking £500 from Chloe's account for Lewis (to feed his drug addiction), and is forced to pay back the money. At Brendan and Melanie's engagement party which is held at the Boulters' place, Brendan confesses that he is bisexual, and Mel calls off the engagement off after outing him. After much coaxing, Mel decided to go to New York City with Brendan, who had originally bought the tickets as an engagement present. Upon their return, Mel and Brendan surprise their families by announcing they had gotten married while in New York. Chrissy is against the idea and wants the marriage annulled but Gary talks her out of it.

In November 2004 on the day of Suzie's christening, Melanie finds out that Brendan lied to her about Jason, a man who identifies himself as Brendan's boyfriend, and she decides to end her relationship permanently. In March 2005, Melanie begins dating Graham Harker, much to the chagrin of the Boulters, and Denise identifies Graham as her rapist. Melanie refuses to believe this claim and stands by Graham until he loses his temper one day and hits her. It is not until Graham is arrested for kidnapping Denise that Melanie realizes the truth. After Gary is acquitted of assaulting Bradley for molesting Chloe and her parents' remarriage, Melanie leaves Charnham. In December 2005, Melanie returns home just before Christmas.

=== Myra Costello ===
Myra Costello was played by Kate Williams from 2003 until the end of the series in 2005.

=== Gemma Craig ===
Gemma Craig was played by Angela Hazeldine from 1999 until the character's departure in 2003.

Gemma forms a friendship with local bad boy Arlo Dean, but their friendship is threatened by the behavior of her Aunt Joyce. Dean's actor, Asier Cebeira, told Pomfret that Gemma brings out Arlo's affectionate side. He added that Arlo "really cares about Gemma and he didn't give a damn about what he had to do to escape Joyce".

Gemma begins a relationship with Paul Webb, who asks her to marry him and she agrees. Hazeldine believed that Gemma had become carried away with planning the wedding because she was young, but she was never sure about whether marrying Paul is the correct thing to do. Gemma develops feelings for Cameron Davenport, and Paul asks Cameron to be his best man. After an argument with Gemma on the eve of their wedding, Paul asks Cameron to help sort their problems, but he ends up sleeping with Gemma.

Hazeldine told Sally Brockway from Soaplife that "[she] just [doesn't] think she's ready to be getting married at the age of 17." Hazeldine believed that Gemma and Paul sparring before they were even married did not bode well for married life. She believed her character would have been content with her relationship had Paul not proposed. Gemma loves Paul but the thought of marriage put pressure on her. Paul becomes suspicious of Gemma and Cameron when he finds them in her bedroom. Hazeldine revealed that Paul had the viewers' sympathy and people would approach her in the street to warn her off Cameron.

== D ==
=== Cameron Davenport ===
Cameron Davenport was played by Rupert Hill from March 2002 until July 2004. He is one of Robert's sons.

=== Ginny Davenport ===
Genevieve (Ginny) Davenport was played by Joanna Foster from 2002 until 2003. She is Robert's wife.

=== Jessica Davenport ===
Jessica Davenport was played by Sammy Glenn from 2002 until 2003. She is Robert's daughter.

=== Jude Davenport ===
Jude Davenport was played by Daniel Jackson in 2003. He is Robert's adopted brother, and he is scorned by Ginny, Cameron, and Lewis after pursuing a romantic liaison with Robert's daughter Jessica.

=== Lewis Davenport ===
Lewis Davenport was played by Sam Stockman from April 2002 until July 2004. He is one of Robert's sons.

=== Robert Davenport ===
Robert Davenport was played by Brian Cowan. Robert arrives in Charnham in 2002 and sets up a catering business in Stanley Street. Frustrated by Ginny, he has a one-night stand with Geri Evans, who later accuses him of rape. Robert is arrested and goes to trial, but is ultimately acquitted. After this Ginny leaves him and moves to France. Robert, along with his employee Fern Farmer, are killed when a runaway car driven by Jake Walker crashes into the workplace in September 2003.

=== Charlotte Day ===
Charlotte Day was played by Leanne Lakey from May to October 2002.

Charlotte begins a relationship with Pete Callan, and later proposes marriage to him, despite allegations that he slept with Claire. Pete accepts after taking advice from his ex-wife, Siobhan Jones. Charlotte begins an affair with Johnny, and when Pete finds out he sets a trap.

=== Lucy Day ===
Lucy Day was played by Julia Lee Smith from 2002 until a few months before the end of the series in 2005.

=== Arlo Dean ===
Arlo Dean was played by Asier Cebeira from 1999 until 2000.

Arlo is characterised as a bad boy with a criminal history, which include glue-sniffing, alcoholism, shoplifting, and blackmail. He begins a relationship with Gemma Craig and their relationship brings out an Arlo's romantic side. He becomes concerned about her well-being around her aunt, Joyce. Cebeira told Pomfret that "Arlo's always been to embarrassed to show any affection – he thinks it's girly. But he really cares about Gemma and he didn't give a damn about what he had to do to escape Joyce." Cebeira preferred his character's wayward ways, adding "Arlo's mischievous streak is more fun to play." Pomfret said that it was unlikely Arlo would ever change his behaviour.

=== Max Derwin ===
Maxwell (Max) Derwin was played by Nick Stringer. Max first entered the series in March 1999 and remained until Christmas Eve that year, when he dies of a heart attack during an argument with his foster son Arlo.

=== Gabriel Drummond ===
Gabriel Drummond was played by Roger Griffiths from June 2002 until the character's departure in September 2003 after running away from his involvement in a car scam.

== E ==
=== Karen Ellis ===
Karen Ellis (née Webb) was played by Tanya Franks from 2000 until 2003.

=== Matt Ellis ===
Matt Ellis was played by Matthew Jay Lewis from 2000 until 2003. Matt arrives in Charnham in November 2000 with his girlfriend Karen Webb. They went to stay with Matt's sister, Nikki, and her family. Matt wants to marry Karen, but she always rejects his proposals because she is not ready yet. Eventually, she accepts his proposal, but before preparations could begin, Karen is diagnosed with breast cancer and the surgery leaves her unable to have children. Matt and Karen proceed with the wedding and look for a surrogate mother, and Kelly Hurst, the lesbian niece of local resident Sadie Hargreaves, offers to be one. Their marriage is broken when Karen starts an affair with Kelly. Matt dates Anna Gregory, a tenant from the local housing project at 14 Stanley Street run by Roy Farmer, A fierce custody battle over the baby ensues, culminating in Kelly's death in December 2002 after she falls down the stairs after arguing with Matt. In September 2003, Matt and Karen leave Charnham along with their baby, Grace, and Karen's brother, Jim, to join Jim's son Paul over in Spain.

=== Geri Evans ===
Geri Evans was played by Anna Acton from 2002 until May 2005.

== F ==
=== Fern Farmer ===
Fern Farmer (previously Derwin) was played by Belinda Sinclair and was first introduced in 1999. She is married to taxi driver Max Derwin and they both raise Arlo. They begin to take in another foster child: Gemma. After taking her in, they decide to stop fostering Arlo. During a subsequent argument with Arlo, Max dies of a heart attack. Fern later learns he has another wife and a biological child living in a neighboring town.

She later marries Roy's father Vince, who has a bad relationship with Gemma. They eventually separate and Vince moves away. Fern takes a job working with Robert Davenport in his catering business. Fern decides to reconcile with Vince when she and Robert are killed when a runaway car driven by Jake crashes into the workplace in September 2003.

=== Roy Farmer ===
Royston Farmer was played by Miles Petit from episode one of the series in March 1997 until November 2003. Roy was best friends with Duncan Hart and Tim Webster, and the on-off boyfriend of Melanie Hart. They split up when Roy was charged with drug possession (actually a set-up by Melanie's sister Holly to get him out of the way), but later reconciled and married. At the wedding reception, held on the Harts' boat, Melanie and the rest of her family were killed in a gas explosion. Roy avoided their fate as he had left the boat to get a hangover cure for Jamie Hart, who was sick after drinking too much. For a time Roy worked for Pete Callan, but they later became bitter enemies.

Roy himself was killed in a fire whilst trying to rescue his new girlfriend Nikki. At the time of his departure, Roy was the last remaining character who had appeared in the first episode.

=== Vince Farmer ===
Vince Farmer was played by Stephen Yardley. He is Roy Farmer's dad and appears briefly in Charnham in 1999 to visit Roy, but he returns in 2000 on a permanent basis. During this time he marries Fern Derwin, but the marriage later crumbled. He leaves in 2003 for France. He planned to return to Fern when she was killed in a car accident. Vince subsequently returns to Charham for Roy's funeral later in 2003.

=== George Fitzgerald ===
Georgina (George) Fitzgerald was played by Florence Hoath from September to December 2005 when the series ended.

=== Barbara Fletcher ===
Barbara Fletcher (previously Trip) was played by Kay Adshead from episode one in March 1997 until 1999.

=== Nathan Fletcher ===
Nathan Fletcher was played by Felix Scott from October until December 2005 when the series ended.

=== Bradley Foster ===
Bradley Foster was played by Harry Capehorn from 2004 until 2005. Bradley appears in Charnham in April 2004 as Melanie Costello's former boyfriend. Bradley took a gap year in Australia the previous year and returns to the UK to live with his mother, Sharon. Chrissy tries to get Bradley and Melanie back together, but fails, as Melanie is engaged to Brendan Boulter. Bradley dates Lucy Day.

Bradley settles into the Costello household as a lodger, and frequently babysits Chloe while Gary and Chrissy go through a divorce. Chloe begins to look on Bradley as an older brother figure, as Melanie marries and moves in with Brendan. One day in October, Chloe tells Chrissy that Bradley had been touching her inappropriately. Chrissy then tells Gary that the allegations are a lie, which put further strain on their marriage. After Chloe is analyzed by a child psychologist, Gary becomes the one to blame, but he is vindicated after Chloe reveals to the social worker that Bradley is the one sexually abusing her. Bradley, after being attacked by Gary outside of the cafe, tries to flee Charnham and attempts to convince Lucy to come with him. One afternoon, Gary arrives late to pick Chloe up, and Bradley abducts her. Lucy, who arranged to meet Bradley in secret, persuades him to bring Chloe home and give himself up. Bradley is arrested but released due to a lack of evidence against him and the fact that Chloe had lied previously.

During a search on Sharon's boyfriend, Conrad Williams's house, where Bradley is staying, the police find child pornography on Bradley's computer. Bradley denies any knowledge of it and accuses Gary of planting images on the hard drive. The images are determined to have been paid for prior to Bradley moving in with the Costellos, but the evidence is not sufficient to sustain a conviction. On November 5, 2004, Gary learns of Bradley's whereabouts from Alex Williams: Bradley, after being thrown out by his stepfather Martin, returned to Charnham and has been staying with the Williams family. Gary leaves the pub, smashes his way into the house, and confronts Bradley. Bradley goads Gary about Chloe seeking attention and not leaving him alone, prompting Gary to punch him, which causes Bradley to fall and hit his head. After Bradley wakes from his coma, and has a successful operation to reattach a loose retina, he is held in custody alongside Gary.

In a conversation with Chrissy, Sharon reveals that she believed that Bradley had molested Chloe as she had suspected her first husband, Bradley's father, had done to him. In April 2005, Gary stands trial for his assault on Bradley. While on the stand, Sharon divulges Bradley's past abuse to help Gary, but the testimony is stricken from the record. The jury find him not guilty. Bradley then leaves Charnham.

== G ==
=== Ben Galloway ===
Ben Galloway was played by Peter England. He is a member of Roy housing project at 14 Stanley Street. He briefly dates Chris Jacobs until he admits that he was gay. They remained friends, and subsequently leave to find alternative accommodation in Brixton in September 2003.

=== Elsa Gates ===
Elsa Gates was played by Delena Kidd from episode one in March 1997 until 1998. She is married to Jack and is the mother of Annie Hart and the grandmother of Duncan, Holly, Melanie and Jamie Hart. Elsa is very prim and conservative, and struggled to accept the lifestyle choices of some of her grandchildren, like Duncan's promiscuity and Holly's bisexuality. In 1998, she is involved in a car accident after Jack drives them home while drunk. Elsa is knocked unconscious and Jack makes it look like she was driving the car that night. When her memory starts to return, he suffocates her and then commits suicide.

=== Jack Gates ===
Jack is Elsa's husband and Annie's father. He has a long running affair with Maria Simons, which is eventually discovered. After crashing his car while drunk he moves his unconscious wife's body into the driving seat to pretend she was driving while she recovers from memory loss. A few weeks later her memory returns, and Jack murders her before committing suicide. As a final act of vengeance against his now-estranged family, he re-writes his will and leaves everything to Pete Callan.

=== Yasmin Green ===
Yasmin Green (née McHugh, previously Matthews and MacKenzie) was played by Ebony Thomas from December 1998 until the end of the series in December 2005.

Yasmin first appeared in December 1998, with her younger brother Benji (Junior Laniyan/Mark McClean) and their mother, Dusty (Doreen Ingleton) who ran the local newsagents on Stanley Street. Yasmin was a rebellious teenager who never really settled down at school and was constantly partying much to her mother's despair. In January 1999, Yasmin became involved with aspiring musician Josh Matthews (Terry Burns). The couple later became engaged and were married the week before Christmas 1999. They went to Jamaica for their honeymoon and returned very much in love. Things were rosy until Josh became bored with married life and started an affair with Julie-Ann Jones (Chloe Howman), the daughter of Black Swann owner Pete Callan (David Easter) and eventually left Yasmin to move to Greece with Julie-Ann in March 2000, breaking Yasmin's heart. Josh returned to Charnham months later, and was upset to discover that Yasmin had moved on with his best friend Declan Byrne (Quentin Jones). Despite this, Josh pursued Yasmin and the two reconciled.

It was not long before Josh cheated again, this time with Julie-Ann's sister, Siobhan (Jemma Walker). Josh wanted to pursue a relationship with Siobhan, but she turned him down for Pete. One night, an engaged Josh broke into the pub and began attacking Pete. Siobhan quickly subdued Josh with a candlestick and phoned for an ambulance. Pete seized his chance to silence Josh for good by hitting Josh again resulting in his death. Yasmin was left widowed and several months pregnant. She became close to Adrian Scott (Ariyon Bakare), who worked in the shop and proved to be a great support for Yasmin. Adrian supported Yasmin after her miscarriage and the two later began dating. Adrian's children were divided on their father dating again. Adrian's daughter Becky (Chandra Reugg) was fine with it, but her brother Darren (Ike Hamilton) resented it as he always hoped his parents would get back together. Adrian was initially nervous about the relationship after he had suffered a harrowing rape while in prison and was worried about being infected with a disease. Eventually, Adrian was given the all-clear and their relationship resumed. In November 2000, Yasmin managed to track down her estranged father, William, who had walked out on her and Benji when they were younger. Benji was resistant and first but eventually warmed to William. It transpired that William had end-stage renal disease and needed a kidney.

After Yasmin broke up with Adrian after catching him kissing his ex wife, Nikki Warrington (Rebecca Blake) in the store one day, she had a string of disastrous relationships. Deke Pascal (Darren Saul), one of Benji's friends whom he met while in Jamaica, wasn't entirely serious about Yasmin and had a bigger commitment to his band and touring. Yasmin then began dating Ziggy (Roger Davies-Roberts), Deke's younger brother, but that had fallen apart once Ziggy left to study retail in Manchester. No sooner after Ziggy had gone, Yasmin became involved with Gabriel Drummond (Roger Griffiths) who had tried to con her out of her shop shortly after Dusty's death in 2002, following a car crash in Jamaica. Yasmin and Gabriel remained together until he left her to go to Jamaica with former flame, Rosa Marshall (Ginny Holder), the mother of his daughter Jade. Gabriel returned several months later to win Yasmin back but she was now dating Amir Sadati (Kayvan Novak). After Amir fled Charnham, following being caught stealing from the store, Gabriel tried to worm his way back into Yasmin's good books. Yasmin eventually gave Gabriel a second chance, and even got engaged. However, feeling the heat from a car scam which had involved local residents Jim Webb (Jo Dow) and Jake Walker (Seb Castang), Gabriel went on the run from the police. Yasmin was left on her own once again.

Shortly after Gabriel's abrupt departure, Yasmin came face to face with old School friend Marc MacKenzie (Michael Wildman) and Yasmin's friend Geri Evans (Anna Acton) began dating Marc. Marc, having been coaxed into posing as Yasmin's fiance for a magazine competition, began having real feelings for Yasmin. Yasmin could no longer hide her feelings and the two married in December 2003, upsetting Geri. Marc quickly became bored with married life and began an affair with Geri in January 2004. Yasmin eventually found out but faked a pregnancy to hold on to Marc. In May 2004, as part of an interactive storyline, viewers could decide via text message who Marc would choose. Marc chose Yasmin, but after learning of Geri's illness, Marc was thrown out and left Charnham shortly after. In early 2005, following her divorce from Marc, Yasmin went to a speed-dating night in the pub and met Adam Green (Ben Hull), a businessman. Within a matter of weeks, Yasmin and Adam were married. Several residents had their suspicions about Adam, but every time they came closer to the truth, Adam covered his tracks. Adam, knowing Yasmin wanted anything more than to have a family of her own, informed her of somebody over the internet looking for someone to adopt their baby. Yasmin sold the store and gave Adam the money. It wasn't until Babs explained that Yasmin was being taken for a ride that things came clear. Once Yasmin confronted Adam, he laughed in her face and got a punch for his troubles which was witnessed by another girlfriend, one of many, who happened to be pregnant. After Marc's return to Charnham in November 2005 and a failed reconciliation, Yasmin set her sights on young Reverend Damian Harrison (Richard Frame) before the series ended.

=== Anna Gregory ===
Anna Gregory was played by Martha Cope.

=== Penny Gwynne ===
Penny Gwynne was played by Georgia Mitchell during 1999. Penny is a shy girl who becomes a lodger in Sadie Hargreaves's home. A reporter from Soaplife branded Penny an "introverted lodger".

== H ==
=== Pamela Hargreaves ===
Pamela Hargreaves (later Pamela Trip) joined the programme in 1997 when she appears as Liam Trip's solicitor. She enters into a relationship with Liam's father, Nick Trip, and they get engaged.

Pamela defends a man accused of sexual assault, Simon Thornton, believing him to be innocent, but before the trial she learns that he is guilty. When Pamela drops the case due to his guilt, Simon stalks her, but neither Nick nor Pamela's mother Sadie believe her. Pamela eventually kills Simon in self-defence after she hits him over the head with an iron. She and Sadie dispose of the body, but are wracked with guilt and fear of being caught for several months.

Pamela marries Nick in 1999. Eventually Simon's makeshift grave on Charnham Common is discovered, and because of her disposal of the body and the lack of reporting the crime, Pamela is convicted of murder and sent to prison.

On her release from prison in 2005, Pamela (now played by Caroline O'Neill) returns to Charnham for several months.

=== Graham Harker ===
Graham Harker was played by Lee Warburton. Graham appears in Charnham in early 2005 when he is hired at the local cab office owned by Gary and Dave Matthews. Denise identifies Graham as her rapist when she gets into his cab and recognizes his aftershave and his use of the phrase "Scout's honor". However, there is no forensic evidence linking him to the crime and Graham is not charged. The Boulters strongly believe he is guilty, and make several attempts to convince him to leave Charnham. Graham refuses to leave dates Gary's daughter, Melanie, who believes he is innocent. He becomes possessive of her, hits her, and holds her against her will in his flat.

Melanie asks for Denise's help but Graham finds out. He kidnaps Denise, but goes off the road after a near miss with Ben and Alex Williams in another car. Denise escapes the wreckage, and saves a trapped Graham at the last second before the car explodes in flames. Denise suggests she saved him as she felt that Graham's death would have been the easy way out.

=== Angus Hart ===
Angus Hart was played by Ian Cullen. He appeared in the programme's first episode. After losing his wife Sally, he comes to live with the family of his son, Chris. He marries Helen Cooper after she tries to convert him to Roman Catholicism, but she was killed minutes after the wedding in a car accident. He and most of his family are killed in a massive boat explosion during the wedding reception of his granddaughter, Melanie Farmer.

=== Annie Hart ===
Annie Hart (née Gates) was played by Liz Crowther from the programme's first episode in March 1997 until 1999. She is married to Chris Hart and the mother of Duncan, Holly, Melanie and Jamie. During the series, she gives birth to a fifth child, Sam. She is good friends with Maria Simons, who owns the local bistro, The Lock. It is later revealed that Annie once had a fling with Chris' business partner Nick Trip. Annie later has an affair with her neighbour, Dave, who also enters a relationship with Annie's elder daughter Holly. On Melanie's wedding night, Annie's affair with Dave is revealed after she discovers Holly's plan to elope with him. Moments later, an explosion on the boat kills Annie, along with the rest of her family.

=== Chris Hart ===
Chris Hart was played by Ian Ashpitel from the programme's first episode in March 1997 until 1999, when he and most of his family are killed in a boat explosion. Chris is a builder and runs a construction business with Nick Trip. Chris is depicted as a traditional, working-class man from Newcastle who struggles with some of his children's life choices.

=== Duncan Hart ===
Duncan Hart was played by Rocky Marshall from the programme's first episode in March 1997 until 1998. Duncan is best friends with Tim and Roy, and is also considered a ladies' man. He has relationships with Annie's friend Maria, the Lock barmaid Susie (who later becomes Holly's girlfriend), and Melanie's friend Claire Toomey, the latter resulting in the birth of twins. Duncan moves away soon afterwards. Duncan briefly returns in 2000 for one week, played by Jonathan Wrather, as he struggles to cope with the loss of almost his entire family.

=== Helen Hart ===
Helen Hart (née Cooper) was played by Janice McKenzie. She marries Angus Hart after trying to convert him to Roman Catholicism. Helen dies when she suffers a heart attack while being treated for injuries sustained in a car accident minutes after her wedding to Angus.

=== Holly Hart ===
Holly Hart was played by Sandra Huggett from the programme's first episode in March 1997 until 1999. The twin sister of Duncan, Holly is a 24-year-old virgin at the start of the series, and originally thought she was a lesbian. She briefly has a relationship with the bisexual Susie, who had also slept with Duncan. Holly later has an affair with their neighbour Dave Matthews, and was planning to elope with him before she was killed along with the rest of her family in the boat explosion.

=== Jamie Hart ===
Jamie Hart was played by Michael Cole from the programme's first episode in March 1997 until 1999, when he and most of his family are killed in a boat explosion.

=== Melanie Hart ===
Melanie Hart was played by Cordelia Bugeja. She is a police constable and the first of the Hart children to leave the family home.

She enters into a relationship with Roy, which ends after he is charged with drug possession. They later reconcile and marry in January 1999, changing her name to Melanie Farmer. During the wedding reception that is being held on the boat previously owned by Jack Gates, a gas explosion tears through the vessel, killing everyone except Roy.

=== Sally Hart ===
Sally Hart, wife of Angus, was played by Jean Heywood from episode one until episode ten, when she dies from drowning.

=== Samuel Hart ===
Samuel James Angus (Sam) Hart is the youngest child of Chris and Annie Hart. He is killed in January 1999 in a boat explosion.

=== Barry Hurst ===
Barry Hurst was played by Tony Booth during 2001.

=== Gloria Hurst ===
Gloria Hurst was played by Joanna Wake from 2001 to 2002.

=== Kelly Hurst ===
Kelly Hurst was played by Nicky Talacko. She arrives on holiday from her home in Australia to visit her aunt Sadie. She is a lesbian who has a girlfriend in Australia. In Charnham she befriends Karen and Matt Ellis, and agree to act as surrogate mother for Karen. After getting pregnant, she and Karen have an affair, and Karen divorces Matt. The affair with Karen continues after the birth of the baby, Grace. Kelly dies in 2002 after falling down a flight of stairs during an argument with Matt.

== I ==
=== Sharon Ingram ===
Sharon Ingram was played by Kim Taylforth from 2004 until 2005. She was Chrissy's best friend until she learns her son Bradley is abusing Chrissy's daughter Chloe.

== J ==
=== Chris Jacobs ===
Chris Jacobs was played by Gemma Wardle. She lived at 14 Stanley Street with Ben and housemates Anna Gregory and Amir Sadati. Chris leaves with Ben in 2003 to find alternative accommodation in Brixton.

=== Gabby Johnson ===
Gabby Johnson is a university student who shares a flat with Clive Starr and Declan. She has romances with various men including Declan, Roy, Pete, and Clive's boyfriend, Adam Sheldrake.

Gabby was played by Emma Linley from January 1999 to 2000.

=== Julie-Ann Jones ===
Julie-Ann Jones was played by Chloe Howman. She first appears in 1999 and leaves in 2000. Julie-Ann is Pete's "love-child" and reunites with him once she grew up. Easter told Sue Malins from Soaplife that his alter-ego regrets not being a part of Julie-Ann's life. Di Hollingsworth from Soaplife described her as a "spoilt little minx who liked to get what she wanted". She noted that Julie-Ann was not afraid to exploit her relationship with Pete, adding that "she's her father's daughter".

Julie-Ann arrives in Charnham to see her older sister Siobhan and gain independence from their parents. Julie-Ann pursues Pete until her mother, Patsy, intervenes and tells her that Pete is her father.

Julie-Ann uses this to her advantage and begins exploiting Pete. Later that year, Julie-Ann has an affair with Siobhan's boyfriend, Declan. In 2000, Julie-Ann is raped by one of Pete's associates, Jon Tyler. Pete takes his revenge by selling him his previous wine bar, The Lock, and flooding it.

That March, Julie-Ann begins an affair with Josh Matthews and the two flee to Greece together, leaving Josh's wife Yasmin devastated. Julie-Ann is never seen in Charnham again, though Pete visits her several times and refers to her on occasion. She is last mentioned by Cat MacKenzie, who informs her of Pete's death and subsequent funeral.

=== Siobhan Jones ===
Siobhan Langley (previously Callan, née Jones) was played by Jemma Walker. She first appeared on a recurring basis from in December 1998. She is an old family friend of Pete. Pete decides that he would do better in a custody battle if he was married, and he decides that Siobhan is an ideal candidate. Easter told Sue Malins from Soaplife that "Siobhan's young, she's vulnerable, but Pete targets her anyway!" She is initially horrified because she never thought about him romantically. Easter said that because he is Julie-Ann's father, she viewed him as a family friend, but he noted that when Pete asks Siobhan to marry him it is done out of genuine feelings for her.

Siobhan enters into a relationship with Declan after he arrives in January 1999, but leaves Charnham two months later after they have a lover's quarrel. She returns later that year and briefly resurrects their relationship, but he cheats on Siobhan with Julie-Ann. Siobhan subsequently aborts Declan's baby, and they remain friends later. She works for Pete, and eventually moves with him to The Black Swan.

In mid-2000 Siobhan marries Pete, and they live together upstairs at The Black Swan. One night, Pete frames her for the murder of pub employee Josh Matthews, whom Siobhan had been in a relationship with, and who had discovered her marriage to Pete is bigamous. Siobhan goes to trial and is found guilty of manslaughter, being given a suspended sentence. She realises she had been framed by Pete, who had been tried alongside her but acquitted. Even though she had legally remarried him, she aborts their child and walks out on him. She becomes good friends with Roy, with whom she briefly had a relationship. She is unable to conceive after a car accident caused when Pete ran the car she was in off the road. She leaves in 2002. About a year after she left, it is reported that Siobhan had since remarried.

== L ==
=== Max Lawson ===
Max Lawson was played by Marcus D'Amico from June to October 2005.

=== Sadie Lloyd ===
Sadie Lloyd was played by Barbara Young from November 1998 until July 2005.

=== Meredith Lovechild ===
Meredith Lovechild is a nurse. She was played by Perdita Avery from September 2005 to the end of the programme.

== M ==
=== Cat MacKenzie ===
Cat MacKenzie (née Evans also Matthews and Webb) was played by Nicola Duffett from late 1998 until the end of the series in December 2005.

Cat was a blustery, boozy, cigarette puffing beautician. She first appeared in Charnham as the wife of philanderer Dave Matthews (Richard Hawley) and stepmother to Josh (Terry Burns). She ran a hairdressing salon on the site later taken by Roy Farmer's (Miles Petit) cybercafe, and she employed Yasmin McHugh (Ebony Thomas) as an apprentice hairdresser (Yasmin's mother, Dusty was a partner in the business), however the business soon failed. After Cat's marriage to Dave broke down she moved in with Pete Callan (David Easter).

After several months Pete convinced her to transfer her home into his name for taxation reasons, and once she had done so revealed he had only moved in with her to con her out of her house. After the relationship ended she realised she was pregnant, and was initially unsure whether the child was Dave's or Pete's. After tests it was revealed to be Pete's. She gave birth to Pete's son, David (nicknamed Davie) in 2001. When Pete discovered he was the father, he was annoyed at Cat for putting down her ex-husband Dave as David Jr's father on the birth certificate. Pete flipped at Cat's deception and briefly became determined to gain custody of their child.

When Cat fell on hard times while struggling to raise Davie and resenting Pete's interference, she fell into prostitution, and then was briefly and unhappily married to Jim Webb (Jo Dow). She later worked as a beautician again when Yasmin opened a salon of her own. Cat eventually found happiness in her marriage to Doug MacKenzie (Gareth Hale) in 2004. However, things ended on a sour note on New Year's Eve 2005, when Doug told Cat their marriage was over following Cat's affair with Tony Tanner (Dominic Rickhards), whom she had worked with during a local pantomime production of "Dick Wittington".

=== Doug MacKenzie ===
Doug MacKenzie was played by Gareth Hale from 2003 until the end of series in 2005. Doug first appears in Charnham in September 2003 when he refits the Davenports' sandwich shop (with his sons Justin and Marc) after a car crash caused by Jake Walker that cause the deaths of Robert Davenport and Fern Farmer. He marries Cat, and on their wedding day, Kelly Boulter gives birth to her and Justin’s daughter, Suzie, named after Justin's mother.

After it became common knowledge Cat and Doug's landlady and friend, Sadie Hargreaves, is in severe mortgage arrears; Doug decides to step in and buy the house. Doug later runs for mayor of Charnham and wins, but Cat's drunken behaviour does not help his image, causing him to resign to return to the building firm. On New Year's Eve 2005, Doug ends his marriage to Cat following an affair she had with Tony, who had been working with her on Babs Woods's production of a Dick Whittington pantomime.

=== Justin MacKenzie ===
Justin MacKenzie was played by Ryan Davenport from 2003 until the end of the series in 2005.

=== Marc MacKenzie ===
Marc MacKenzie was played first by Michael Wildman from 2003 to 2004, and then by Graham Bryan in 2005 until the final episode. He first appears in Charnham in September 2003 with his father Doug and half-brother Justin MacKenzie to help renovate the recently destroyed sandwich shop when a car driven by Jake smashed into the building. Marc previously worked for his mother Janey's boyfriend's building firm until he was sacked for fighting with a colleague.

Marc flirts with Yasmin Matthews, who he had attended school with. The attraction is mutual, but her engagement to Gabriel prevents them from acting on it. After Gabriel flees town due to his involvement in a car scam, Marc agrees to pose as Yasmin's fiancée for a magazine competition Yasmin had entered. Geri takes a liking to Marc and they began dating while Marc and Yasmin pretend to be an engaged couple, and they actually marry on Christmas Day. Despite being married to Yasmin, Marc's feelings for Geri never go away and in May 2004, he is forced to choose between them. Marc chooses Yasmin, but she throws him out. After Doug's wedding to Cat and Suzie's birth in July, Marc leaves Charnham to live in Ireland. In August 2005, Cat becomes suspicious of where Doug had been going and suspects him of cheating on her with his secretary, when he had been meeting with Marc, who had recently split with his girlfriend after a miscarriage. Cat is cold towards Marc, who had hurt her niece Geri. Yasmin is not happy to see him either. Marc purchases the corner café from Les, and later began seeing waitress Katie Williams while rekindling his relationship with Yasmin. Neither fling works out when one of his ex-girlfriends, Lara, leaves his six-year-old daughter Poppy. Marc's family are shocked that he had kept his daughter a secret. Marc struggles to look after Poppy over the course of Lara's absence and frequently leaves her in Justin or Cat and Doug's care. Lara eventually comes back for Poppy and leaves Marc's life again.

=== Rosa Marshall ===
Rosa Marshall was played by Ginny Holder for six months in 2002.

=== Dave Matthews ===
Dave first appears in Charnham in late 1998 along Cat and Josh. Initially an extramarital love interest for local resident, Annie Hart, Dave turns his attention to her adult daughter Holly. Dave and Holly secretly plan to elope together the day after Melanie's wedding, but never happened because Holly and most of the other Hart family members are killed in a boat explosion during the wedding reception. Dave keeps the relationship with Holly secret for some time, but Cat is later horrified to learn of it from Dave.

Dave and Cat's marriage go through several rough patches; including Dave suffering from multiple sclerosis, Cat leaving Dave for Pete and falling pregnant, and Dave faking his own death. In early 2000, Cat gives birth to Dave Matthews Jr, who after a DNA test is revealed to be Pete's son. In August 2000, Josh is murdered by Pete, who frames his then-wife Siobhan. Dave knows that Pete had killed Josh, but has no way of proving it. In November 2000, Pete pays Dave, who had been separated from Cat at this point, to give evidence in court to portray her as an unfit mother. Dave, uses the opportunity to take the money and testify in Cat's favour. Dave quickly leaves Charnham to evade Pete.

In February 2003, Yasmin learns that Dave had been arrested and needs bail. She pays his bail and Dave is released, returning to Charnham where he resumes his rivalry with Pete. After a few weeks, Dave's new stepson Jake Walker returns and the two form a close bond. Jake is arrested following a car accident that kills Robert and Fern. Following Jake's accident and attempts to flee Charnham, Dave meets DC Cheryl Barker, the officer involved and they date and live together. Dave and Cheryl's relationship is continually tested by Dave's tendency to act outside of the law. After interference from Cheryl's boss and ex-lover, DI Patrick Grenham, Dave and Cheryl break up.

Dave is interested in Eileen Callan, Pete's fourth wife. Dave is brought into her plot to frame Pete for arson. After Pete discovers the plot and throws Eileen into the River Thames, she and Dave are together for several weeks until she returns to Pete. Becoming disillusioned with life in Charnham, Dave decides to leave for Scotland in 2005, and Jake decides to go with him. They both make offers to Eileen and Lucy respectively to come with them, but Pete intervenes and attacks Dave. In the end, Eileen and Lucy decline. Dave and Jake then leave Charnham, and Lucy joins them several months later.

=== Josh Matthews ===
Josh Matthews was played by Terry Burns. Josh arrived in November 1998 with his stepmother Cat, looking for his father Dave, who had left them to deal with his debts, and starts working for Pete as a barman at The Lock. In 1999, Josh starts a singing career and records a CD that does not sell. Later that year, Josh starts a romance with Yasmin. The week before Christmas, Josh and Yasmin get married and go on their honeymoon to Jamaica. Three months into his marriage to Yasmin, Josh becomes bored and has an affair with Julie-Ann, and leaves Charnham for Greece with her, leaving Yasmin heartbroken.

Months later, Josh returns to patch things up with Yasmin. Josh and Dave endure a long-running enmity with Pete. who has an affair with Cat while Dave is diagnosed with multiple sclerosis and fathers Dave Jr. When Pete opens The Black Swan, which becomes the local pub, Josh is forced to work there to pay off a debt. Josh falls for Siobhan and begins an affair with her. Josh finds out Pete and Siobhan are engaged to be married, and she tells him to go back to Yasmin, who is pregnant with Josh's baby. Josh visits to Claire, Pete's ex-wife, who reveals that she is still married to Pete. One night in 2000, Josh confronts Pete, and the two get into a fight. Siobhan wakes up and hits Josh over the head with a candlestick. Pete uses the opportunity to kill Josh. Siobhan and Pete are subsequently questioned; Pete is released Siobhan is detained. Yasmin initially blames Siobhan for Josh's death, but Dave is certain Pete is the killer, but has no way of proving it. In 2001, the case goes to trial and neither Pete nor Siobhan are found guilty.

=== Benji McHugh ===
Benji McHugh was played by Junior Laniyan between December 1998 and July 2001, and Mark McLean between December 2002 and December 2003. After moving into Charnham with his mother and sister, Benji falls in love with his school teacher Maggie Roswell, who is married with two young sons. She leaves her husband Geoff, running away with Benji and taking her sons with them. After a while, Maggie encourages Benji to give up and return to Charnham. Whilst being chased by the authorities, Maggie's car crashes, leaving her, Benji and her sons trapped inside. Benji manages to save the boys, but the car explodes and Maggie is killed. Geoff initially blames Benji for Maggie's death and leaves Charnham with his sons. To get over everything, Benji goes on holiday to Jamaica before returning.

Benji and Yasmin's aunt, Pearl, takes over Dusty's shop and looks out for them. Benji begins dating Donna Lewis (Petra Letang), but it does not work out. Several months later, he dates Sara Warrington, but she enters into a relationship with Arlo. When revising for his exams and getting drunk, Benji reveals his true feelings for his neighbour Gemma. Later that year, Benji comes face to face with his estranged father, William, who had walked out on him and Yasmin when they were very young. Although Yasmin is keen to get to know William, Benji refuses until William's girlfriend, Kim, reveals that he is suffering from end-stage renal disease. Benji and William start and maintain a relationship, keeping in contact. Benji begins to be bullied in sixth form by Jason Harris, a racist. One night whilst coming home from a date with Gemma, Benji is attacked by Jason, but Declan manages to defuse the situation. When Paul Webb arrives, she leaves Benji and dates Paul. Benji leaves Charnham and returns to Jamaica. Several months after Dusty's death in 2002, Benji returns to Charnham. He has several relationships, including Chris Jacobs, Becky Scott, and Kelly Boulter. After Kelly admits that Justin is the father of her baby. Benji leaves Charnham forever.

=== Dusty McHugh ===
Dusty McHugh was played by Doreen Ingleton. She is the loud and bossy divorced mother of Yasmin and Benji. She owns and runs her own minimarket business Dusty's Store. In 1999 she moved to Jamaica to care for an invalid relative, and her sister-in-law Pearl McHugh arrives to run the business and care for Yasmin and Benji. Dusty makes a brief return appearance in Charnham for Yasmin's wedding to Josh in December that year. In 2002, Dusty dies off-screen in a car crash in Jamaica.

=== Pearl McHugh ===
Pearl McHugh was played by Doña Croll from 1999 until 2002.

== O ==
=== Eve O'Brien ===
Eve O'Brien was played by Zara Dawson from October until the end of the programme.

== P ==
=== Johnny Palmer ===
Johnny Palmer was played by Iain Fletcher. He is mainly known for his feuds with Pete and his romantic involvements with Eileen, Charlotte, and Claire.

=== Deke Pascal ===
Deke Pascal was played by Darren Saul from 2001 until 2002. Deke arrives in Charnham in June 2001 as Benji's friend, whom he met while in Jamaica on holiday. Yasmin likes Deke and they begin dating. He later moves into the flat above Dusty's store with Benji, Yasmin, and their aunt Pearl. Later on, Deke's younger brother Ziggy comes to Charnham after being released from prison after serving time for drug-related offences and killing his sister. At first, Deke wants nothing to do with Ziggy, but relents after Pearl and Yasmin convince him. Deke frequently spends time rehearsing with his band, which puts a strain on his relationship with Yasmin, driving her into Ziggy's arms. Deke leaves Charnham in February 2002 after finding about their affair.

=== Ziggy Pascal ===
Ziggy Pascal was played by Roger Davies-Roberts from 2001 until 2002.

=== Hector Price ===
Hector Price was played by Andrew Hinton-Brown from September to the end of the programme.

== R ==
=== Hester Randall ===
Hester Randall was played by Catherine Kanter for several weeks in December 2005 until the end of the programme.

=== Rex Randall ===
Rex Randall was played by John Hopkins from November to December 2005 when he is killed offscreen by Katie in the last episode.

=== Ratty ===
Ratty is a pet dog owned by Maria Simons and Roy, and later Sadie Hargreaves. Producers initially planned to kill the dog off with ecstasy tablets, but the dog survives.

=== Daniel Renshaw ===
Daniel Renshaw was played by Joseph Hill from 2001 to 2002.

=== Linda Renshaw ===
Linda Renshaw was played by Alison Newman for several months in 2001. She is Paul Webb's biological mother who rejects him after he tracks her down and tries to build a relationship with her.

=== Susie Ross ===
Susie Ross was played by Tina Landini from 1997 to 1999. She is a bisexual woman who sleeps with Duncan and Holly. After taking Holly's virginity, Holly pursues Susie and they have a long-term relationship.

== S ==
=== Amir Sadati ===
Amir Sadati was played by Kayvan Novak. He is one of the tenants of Roy's housing project at 14 Stanley Street, and is a bad influence on Darren Scott. Amir briefly works for Yasmin and dates her until he is caught stealing from her store, subsequently leaving Charnham.

=== Adrian Scott ===
Adrian Scott was played by Ariyon Bakare between March 2000 and May 2001.

He is Nikki's ex-husband and a former convict. He arrives in Charnham to gain access to his children Becky and Darren. He discovers that Nikki is having an affair with her step-son Luke Warrington. Adrian orders her to let Becky and Darren live with him or he will tell her husband, Andrew.

=== Becky Scott ===
Becky Scott was played by Chandra Reugg between January 2000 and December 2003. Becky first arrives in Charnham in January 2000 with her brother Darren, their mother Nikki, stepfather Andrew, and step-siblings Luke and Sara. Her biological father Adrian reappears in their lives after serving time for being an accessory to armed robbery.

Later that year, Adrian leaves Charnham after discovering Nikki's affair with Luke, and takes Becky and Darren to live with his parents in Tottenham. Becky runs back home to the Warringtons. At Christmas, the affair is exposed; Andrew leaves Nikki, Sara moves out, and Becky and Darren have to adjust to Nikki and Luke being a couple. In December 2001, Luke searches for Sara who had gone missing for several days. She is eventually found, but Luke stays in the area and rekindles his relationship with Nikki. Becky and Luke have a fling of their own, which ends after Becky contracts cystitis and Luke leaves town. She later has relationships with Lewis Davenport, Benji McHugh and Brendan Boulter. Nikki begins a relationship with Roy and eventually marries him, but Roy is killed in a fire at his cybercafé. After Roy's funeral, Becky, Darren, and Nikki leave Charnham.

=== Darren Scott ===
Darren Scott was played first by Joe Fox for much of 2000 then by Ike Hamilton from 2001 to 2003, when he, Nikki, and Becky leave Charnham after Roy dies in the cybercafé fire.

=== George Shackleford ===
George Shackleford was played by Miles Anderson from July 2001 to January 2002.

=== Joan Shackleford ===
Joan Shackleford (previously Short) was played by Margi Clarke from 2001 to 2002. She gave birth to Pete in 1959, and remarried Kevin Short around 1970. She knew Pete was being abused by his stepfather but never batted an eyelid. She appears in 2001 at the time of Pete's court case over Josh Matthews' murder.

=== Tom Shackleford ===
Tom Shackleford was played by Tom Healy from 2001 until 2002.

=== Sami Shafiq ===
Sami Shafiq was played by Hosh Kane from June to December 2005 shortly before the end of the series. Sami arrives in Charnham in June 2005 with his partner Max Lawson, who buys Dusty's store from Yasmin. Yasmin and Sami do not like each other first, but they become good friends. Max and Sami's relationship is plagued with problems, as Max is separated from his wife, Carrie, and their children are kept in the dark. Max eventually goes back to his family, and Sami dates Australian backpacker Brett Owen. After a stabbing following a disagreement with his mother days after his father's death, Sami moves to Melbourne with Brett.

=== Mike Shaw ===
Mike Shaw was played by Tony O'Callaghan from November 2003 to June 2004, and made several flashback appearances in September 2004. Mike arrives in Charnham in November 2003. Eileen enlists his help to take revenge on Pete for sleeping with her daughter Lucy and rejecting her afterwards. Mike devises a plan for Eileen to get a hold of Pete's assets by marrying him and then framing him for arson. Mike sets fire to the local cybercafé owned by Roy. The plan works, but results in Roy's death. Eileen is left racked with guilt, but Mike persuades her to not turn herself in, and begins extorting money. When Eileen's son, Sam Taylor, reappears in her life, he begins asking questions about his father. Eileen tells Mike that Sam was his son who was born shortly after Mike went to prison. Mike and Sam begin spending time together. Mike asks Sam to move to Spain with him.

On the day of Pete's trial. Mike urges Eileen to testify against her husband in court. After testimony from a surprise witness, Pete is acquitted. Back at the Black Swan, Mike attacks Eileen in anger and drags her into the bathroom, attempting to rape her. Dave and Lucy hear Eileen's screams and break down the bathroom door. Mike is knocked down momentarily by Dave before being pushed by Lucy, causing him to hit his head, killing him instantly.

=== Adam Sheldrake ===
Adam Sheldrake was played by Vince Leigh from 1999 to 2000.

Adam dates Clive when he arrives in Charnham. The relationship fizzles after Adam becomes cagey about his home life, and worries about how being outed would affect his career. Adam and Clive got back together shortly after Adam returns to Charnham to help in the search for Benji who had run off with his teacher, Maggie Roswell. Adam later reveals he had a daughter from his previous marriage.

When Clive goes away on tour, Adam becomes involved with Gabby; Clive is devastated when he finds out. Adam and Gaby get engaged, but break it off on the day of the wedding. Adam leaves Charnham before returning five months later to investigate Josh's murder.

=== Diane Short ===
Diane Short was played by Pooky Quesnel from 2001 until 2002.

=== Maria Simons ===
Maria Simons (previously Starr and Callan) was played by Annie Miles from 1997 to 2000. She was married to Pete before the programme began. She owns The Lock and is good friends with Annie Hart. At the start of the series, Maria is having an affair with Annie's son Duncan. She also has an affair with Jack Gates, Annie's father.

Many of her major storylines are connected to her desire to have children after Pete beats her and renders her sterile. She deceives her new husband Dudley Starr into believing she was pregnant, when she is hiding a cushion under her dress. She kidnaps a baby from a hospital and tries to pass it off as her own. The baby's real parents track her down and the baby is returned to them; they do not press charges.

Pete plots to get her out of Charnham. He pays to unofficially adopt a baby, which he gives to Maria on the condition that she leaves town and never returns. She leaves with the baby and is not seen in Charnham again.

=== Clive Starr ===
Clive Starr was played by Huw Bevan. Clive is introduced in January 1999 as a university student pursuing a Media Studies degree and sharing a flat with Declan and Gabby. He falls in love with Declan, who is straight. After that, he has a succession of short-lived gay relationships and grows increasingly depressed over his physical appearance, and attempts suicide. At one point, he finds himself in a love triangle with Adam and Gabby.

After graduating from university he works as a radio presenter. He later works as a bar manager for Pete at the Lock, and follows Pete to his new pub The Black Swan before moving away in 2001.

=== Dudley Starr ===
Dudley Starr was played by David Verrey. Dudley first arrives in Charnham as the new chef at The Lock. He initially claimed to be a Frenchman named Serge Pompidour, but was rumbled as a phoney by Jack Gates. His brother Clive moves to Charnham as well. Dudley marries Maria but leaves her when he learns she kidnapped a baby, and is not seen in Charnham again.

=== Sean Steel ===
Sean Steel was played by Sam Barriscale from 2003 until the character's death on New Year's Day 2005 after being stabbed.

== T ==
=== Olly Taylor ===
Olly is the brother of Sam Taylor, and has a brief fling with Lucy. He fights against Jake for Lucy, culminating in him pushing Jake off some scaffolding placed in the street.

=== Sam Taylor ===
Sam Taylor was played by Leon Ockenden between May and December 2004.

=== Claire Toomey ===
Claire Callan (née Toomey) was played by Tina Hall. She appeared from episode one in 1997 until 2003.

Claire is best friends with Melanie, and later has an affair with Melanie's brother Duncan and becomes pregnant. She gives birth to twins Ewan and Stella, but Duncan rejects Claire and the twins. After Duncan leaves in 1998, Claire marries Pete, who loves her children but abuses her. After the Hart family is killed in a boat explosion in January 1999, Roy becomes mentally unbalanced for a time, and kidnaps and threatens to murder Claire. Soon afterwards, Claire leaves town after Pete beats her for defending Roy.

In 2000, she returns to Charnham without her twins, who are with her sister. She feuds with Pete and goes into business with Roy. Claire begins a relationship with Roy, whom she used for financial gain. She becomes aware of Roy's interest in Sara and a feud erupts when Claire tries to warn Sara away from Roy by taunting her about her drug addiction. Roy ends his relationship with Claire and begins dating Sara.

In 2001, Claire blackmails Pete when she discovered his part in Josh's death, and uses the money to buy a share of the cybercafé. During the police investigation, Claire lies that Pete had loaned her the money, and when Pete is acquitted of Josh's murder, he uses that to proposition her into giving him her shares of the cafe. Claire offers him 5% of her shares.

Claire's feud with Pete continues, and she starts a relationship with his rival Tom Shackleford, as well as a brief affair with George Shackleford. Claire helps Tom when he flees Charnham with his daughter, Harriet, when Pete attempts to turn her against him. As revenge, Pete tells Claire that Tom had planned to run away with his ex-partner Kate, making Claire jealous. Claire begs Tom to stay, but he decides to leave with Kate and Harriet, leading to a car accident caused by Pete, which kills Kate.

In 2002, when Pete is dating Charlotte, rumours circulate that he had slept with Claire. When Charlotte begins acting secretive, Claire decides to investigate her behaviour to destroy their relationship, only to discover that Charlotte had been meeting her estranged younger sister Lucy. Claire become close with another of Pete's nemeses, Johnny. They decide to get revenge on Pete by faking Claire's murder and framing Pete for it. Pete finds out and confronts Claire. She trashes her house to make it seem like Pete had broken in and murdered her. However the plan was ruined by Ben, who is infatuated with her. Claire continues to hide and fake her death, whilst Johnny blackmails Pete into giving him The Black Swan Pub. Johnny betrays Claire by revealing her whereabouts to Pete, forcing her to return. With her plans failing and potentially facing charges for perverting the course of justice, Claire leaves Charnham permanently in early 2003.

=== Liam Trip ===
Liam was played by Stephen Hoyle from 1997 to 1999. He is introduced as Nick's teenage son, and becomes friends with Jamie and Benji. He begins working for Pete, but when he is arrested for robbery, Pete abandons him. He briefly returns to live with Nick after being released before leaving the area.

=== Nick Trip ===
Nick Trip was played by Barry McCormick from 1997 to 1999. He is Chris Hart's partner in a building business. It is revealed that years before he had a brief affair with Chris's wife Annie. He later marries Pamela, but the marriage ends when she is sent to prison for killing the man who was stalking her. Nick leaves town in 1999.

== W ==
=== Jake Walker ===
Jake Walker was played by Seb Castang. He is first seen when he is sentenced to two years in a young offenders' institute after accidentally killing Fern and Robert in a police chase.

Jake serves half of his sentence and returns in December 2004, remaining in Chanrham until May 2005.

=== Trish Wallace ===
Patricia "Trish" Wallace, played by Gabrielle Glaister, made her first appearance in September 2004. She leaves in September 2005 after being shot by Pete during a siege at The Black Swan. She is hospitalised and jailed.

=== Andrew Warrington ===
Andrew arrives in Charnham as part of the new Warrington family.

=== Luke Warrington ===
Luke Warrington was played by Royce Cronin from January 2000 until March 2001, and from December 2001 to May 2002.

=== Nikki Warrington ===
Nikki Warrington was played by Rebecca Blake from January 2000 until December 2003.

Nikki arrives in Charnham with her children Becky and Darren. She is accompanied by her husband Andrew and his grown up children Sara and Luke. She develops an attraction with Luke and they have an affair. Nikki's ex-husband Adrian learns of their affair, and blackmails her into letting him take Becky and Darren away.

Becky is miserable living with Adrian and runs away to visit Luke at university. Nikki goes to collect her but ends up sleeping with Luke despite the trouble their affair already created.

Andrew begins to suspect an affair when he returns from an American lecture tour. He is suspicious of Adrian taking the children and demands answers. Nikki lies to Andrew claiming she has been unfaithful with a colleague. Andrew is angry with Nikki but also willing to save their marriage.

=== Jim Webb ===
Jim Webb was played by Jo Dow from December 2000 until September 2003. Jim arrives in Charnham in December 2000, not long after his sister Karen and her boyfriend Matt arrive. Jim had lost his wife, Cathy several years earlier. Due to the cramped conditions at Number 12, where Matt and Karen were staying with Matt's sister, Nikki and her family, Jim originally intends to rent a room from Sadie across the street, but is stopped when she has a heart attack, and Jim stays with the Warringtons. As 2001 approaches, Jim and Karen's brother Paul arrives. Later that year, Linda Renshaw, an ex-girlfriend of Jim's, reappears in his life. It is revealed that Linda is Paul's biological mother and Jim is not Paul's brother, but his biological father. Jim got Linda pregnant when they were teenagers and Jim and Karen's parents raised Paul as their own and Jim went to join the army.

In December, Jim has an affair with Nikki, despite him recently marrying Cat, who is pregnant with Jim's child. Nikki decides to end it and tells Jim to go back to Cat. After a series of arguments, Cat's constant drinking and smoking which lead to her aborting Jim's baby, Jim decides to separate from her. Jim buys Nikki's house after her husband Andrew decides to sell it. In 2002, Jim gets involved with Geri, but sleeps with Cat again. In September 2003, after a bungled business venture with Gabriel, which involves stolen cars and results in Jake killing Robert and Fern in a car crash, Jim decides to move back to Spain to join Paul, who had recently settled out there after reuniting with his on-off girlfriend Gemma.

=== Paul Webb ===
Paul Webb was played by Martin Delaney from January 2001 until July 2003.

Paul begins a relationship with Gemma and later proposes marriage to her. Unbeknownst to Paul, his fiancée develops feelings for Cameron. The couple have an argument the day before their wedding, and Cameron agrees to help sort their problems, but his intervention results in Gemma and Cameron having sex.

=== Tim Webster ===
Played by Idris Elba, Tim Webster appears in the first episode. He is a good friend of Duncan Hart and Roy Farmer, and attempts to romance his sister Holly, though he is thwarted by Holly's confusion over her sexuality and relationship with Susie Ross, and her affair with Dave. Tim is arrested for attempted murder after a policeman who had earlier racially abused him was violently assaulted and left in a coma. However, the officer himself clears him after waking from his coma. Tim was eventually written out of the series as part of the revamp that saw the Hart and Gates families eliminated from the show, departing a few months prior to most of the original cast members.

=== Coral Wilding ===
Coral, played by Katy Edwards from June until December 2005, is married to Jason Wilding. The couple moved into the street in the final weeks of the show. Coral is a glamorous loudmouth who clashes with many residents.

=== Jason Wilding ===
Jason Wilding was played by Daniel Hyde from October until December 2005 when the series ended.

=== Alex Williams ===
Alex Williams was played by Jake McCarthy from late 2004 until October 2005. He is one of Conrad Williams's children, Ben's twin brother, Katie's younger brother, and Ania's older brother. He feels guilty over Ben being in juvenile detention for manslaughter, since Ben was protecting him from a boy who had been bullying him. Alex has a crush on Melanie, and he loses his virginity to Jane Hughes, a homeless girl staying with the Costellos; when he realises she is lying about being friends with Melanie, she accuses him of rape but later admits the truth. He leaves to live with his mother after an argument with Conrad.

=== Ania Williams ===
Ania Willams was played by Elizabeth Holmes-Gwillim.

=== Ben Williams ===
Ben Williams was played by Adam Rhys Dee from January 2005 until the final episode in December 2005. Ben arrives in Charnham in January 2005, shortly after serving four years imprisonment for manslaughter: he had accidentally drowned Luke Pellow, a boy who was bullying Alex. On the weekend of their 18th birthday, Ben and Alex take a car their father, Conrad, had bought for them for a drive. The twins have an argument about the last few years and Ben's inability to reconnect with the family. Ben goads Alex about being a wimp and a loser. Later that day, the twins are involved in a car crash with Denise and Graham after Ben grabs the steering wheel from Alex. Alex decides to take the blame for the accident and escapes with a suspended license.

Ben later finds work with Justin MacKenzie at his father's building firm, MacKenzie and Sons. When Max and Sami purchase Dusty's store from Yasmin and move into the area, Ben does not like them. Ben is accused of being homophobic due to his lack of remorse for a botched building job he had done on the shop and frequent comments he had made, and he punches Sami one night at a house party. When Max questions him, Ben reveals that he had a non-physical, homosexual relationship with another boy while in the young offender's Institute. Soon after Alex leaves to live with their mother Ella and sister Ania in Los Angeles, and Conrad leaves for Fiji with his lover, Tanya Woods, Ben moves in with Justin and Marc. Ben helps renovate the recently burned out Black Swan pub, which is later renamed the Phoenix. It is revealed that Ben is a closeted homosexual, and he has a brief affair with a boy from the area.

=== Conrad Williams ===
Conrad was played by Simon Merrells, and is the father of the Williams family. He appeared from September 2004 to October 2005. As a single parent, he deals with the repercussions of his son Ben spending time in juvenile detention for accidentally killing a classmate, as well as his relationship with Sharon after her son Bradley is revealed to have abused Chloe. He has an affair with Tanya Woods, which ends when she realises she got pregnant by her fiancé John Stokes and marries him. Two of his children, Ania and Alex, leave to live with their mother, while Katie and Ben move out of the house. Conrad is reunited with Tanya, whose marriage broke down after she suffered a miscarriage, and they leave together.

=== Katie Williams ===
Katie Williams was played by Robyn Page from October 2004 until the final episode in December 2005.

=== Babs Woods ===
She was played by Jan Harvey from 2003 until the end of the programme in 2005.

=== Tanya Woods ===
Tanya Woods, played by Carol Starks, made her first appearance in 2003.

Tanya works at St David's hospital as a nurse. She treats Jake he kills Robert and Fern in a car crash. She later moves in with her best friend Sean, and they try to adopt a baby together. They try to adopt Charlie, but Charlie's mother Sarah comes back. Tanya later gives birth to a baby boy, Harry. Soon after, Sean dies in hospital after being stabbed by some teenagers on New Year's Eve.

For the remainder of 2005, Tanya is involved in a love triangle with John and Conrad. John proposes to Tanya and they are married that September. They soon leave Charnham. Tanya miscarries and leaves John. Weeks later, Tanya realises she loves Conrad and returns to Charnham on a rainy night to let him know. The two share a kiss and leave for Fiji.

Starks was nominated for the 2005 British Soap Award for Best Actress (Tanya Woods).
