= Sara Warrington =

- Family Affairs character
- Portrayed by: Beth Cordingly
- Duration: 2000–2001
- First appearance: 10 January 2000
- Last appearance: 13 February 2001
In-universe information
- Father: Andrew Warrington
- Mother: Luisa Warrington
- Stepmother: Nikki Warrington
- Brothers: Luke Warrington

Sara Warrington is a fictional character from the British soap opera Family Affairs, played by Beth Cordingly. She debuted on-screen during 2000 and left the show the following year.

== Development ==
The character was introduced along with her father Andrew Warrington (Simon Cook), stepmother Nikki Warrington (Rebecca Blake), brother Luke Warrington (Royce Cronin), and step-siblings Becky Scott (Chandra Reugg) and Darren Scott (Joe Fox). Andrew and Nikki are newly married and bring their family to Charnham to live together in one house for the first time. Wendy Granditer of Inside Soap noted that there was a lot of tension between the siblings, so the family were in for "some explosive storylines." A spokesperson for Channel 5 stated that the introduction of the Warrington family was "the perfect way to launch Family Affairs into the new millennium." They added that the family's integration into the community would effect several of the show's established characters. Cordingly was cast as "wildchild" Sara shortly after she left drama school.

One of the character's more notable storylines was her decent into drug addiction, which later saw her take an overdose. Cordingly carried out a lot of research into the issue and spoke with her brother and sister-in-law, who are both doctors. She called it "an invaluable learning curve". Sara later suffers a seizure. Cordingly wanted to be sure that her performance was accurate, so she spoke to people with epilepsy to ensure her portrayal was not deemed fake.

Sara develops feelings for Roy Farmer (Miles Petit) despite him being in a relationship with Claire Toomey (Tina Hall). She tries to seduce Roy by climbing naked into his bed. Petit told Sally Brockway from Soaplife that Roy does not feel able to be with Sara due to their age difference. He initially assumed a paternal role with her and thought her to be vulnerable. He feels sorry for her and gives guidance as he knows about drug addiction. Petit said that "Sara's still very immature and has never had a proper relationship. Roy sees her feeling for him as some schoolgirl crush and thinks he'd be taking advantage if he succumbed. He's been very strong because he's smitten with her." Sara decides to prove Roy wrong by attending a self-help clinic. Petit said that this development changed Roy's perception of Sara and ponders a future with her. Though Petit stressed that "he would desperately like to get involved, but he believes he should be protecting her." Meanwhile, Claire does not want Sara around because she knew Sara was taking Roy from her. Petit believed that his character would have to leave Claire because he truly loved Sara.

The character departed during the episode broadcast on 13 February 2001, as she leaves Charnham to go to rehab and reconcile with her father, Andrew. Her decision comes after Claire tries to prove that she is still "weak-willed". Cordingly said that Claire starts by calling Sara a "junkie" and telling her that she cannot change. She then proves her point by leaving some money out on the table to test Sara, who initially thinks she is strong enough to resist. However, she soon realises that if everyone believes she is a junkie, she should take the money and call her dealer. Sara is then seen staggering around the town, and Cordingly explained "She's found in the street in a complete mess from her bender. It's then that she decides she has to sort herself out properly. Roy Farmer begs her to stay – and she almost does – but she's made the decision to stand on her own two feet, get counselling and live with her dad." Cordingly admitted that she was not sure she would ever return to the serial as "the new de-toxed Sara". She said she enjoyed playing Sara and was grateful that the writers had left it open for her character to reappear.

== Storylines ==
A rebellious teenager who clashed with her young stepmother Nikki Warrington, Sara eventually left home to work as a lap dancer, spending much of her income on cocaine. Sara had relationships with Benji McHugh and Arlo Dean. Sara remained with Arlo longer. One night in August 2000, Sara overdosed on some Ecstasy Arlo had given her and nearly died. Arlo, racked with guilt, panicked and fled into the night. Fortunately, Sara survived. Luisa, Sara's mother made a reappearance in her life for several months. Luisa's boyfriend Tony made a pass at Sara which she rejected. After all of this, Tony eventually left Charnham. Later on, Sara discovered her brother Luke was having an affair with Nikki. This revelation tore the family apart. Sara then formed a relationship with Roy Farmer, despite being much younger than he was. This eventually fizzled out due to the age gap and a constant clash with Claire Toomey, who Roy was sharing his house with at the time. After getting herself back on her feet, she left to join Andrew in Wales. In December 2001 when Luke returned to Charnham, he mentioned Sara had gone missing while staying with friends (off-screen), she was eventually found.

== Reception ==
A Soaplife reporter said that "selfish Sara" had a "warped logic" when she chose to sleep with her mother's boyfriend, Tony. They questioned "what is it about those Warringtons that makes them so keen to keep it in the family?" Phil Penfold of The Stage branded the character "a wilful, unpleasant brat."
