= Eileen Callan =

- Family Affairs character
- Portrayed by: Rosie Rowell
- Duration: 2002–2005
- First appearance: 20 October 2002
- Last appearance: 30 December 2005
In-universe information
- Occupation: Former Landlady
- Husband: Pete Callan (2003-2005)
- Sons: Sam Taylor
- Daughters: Charlotte Day; Lucy Day

Eileen Callan (also Day) is a fictional character from the British soap opera Family Affairs, played by Rosie Rowell from 2002 until the end of the series in 2005.

== Storylines ==
Eileen first arrived in Charnham, in October 2002, where her daughters Charlotte Day and Lucy Day were living. Charlotte resented this and left immediately, but Lucy was happy to see her mother again. Pete Callan, Charlotte's ex-boyfriend, viewed Eileen with not much regard but things came to a head on Christmas Day when Pete and Eileen kissed. Eileen went on to have a complex relationship with Pete, which managed to survive her sleeping with Lucy's boyfriend, Jake Walker. When Eileen found out Lucy had tried to commit suicide after sleeping with Pete, who rejected her, she set about getting revenge. Eileen formulated a plan to marry Pete so she could divorce him and take half of his money, but this revenge plan got complicate once Mike Shaw, Eileen's former boyfriend and pimp was in the mix. Mike organised a scheme to have Pete put away for arson, by setting fire to The local cybercafe which was owned by Pete's enemy, local resident Roy Farmer. The plan backfired as Roy was killed in the fire while saving his wife, Nikki Warrington. Pete was arrested on his and Eileen's wedding day, which occurred coincidentally on the same day as Roy's funeral. Eileen was made interim licensee of the Black Swan Pub Pete owned.

During this period, Eileen's conscience managed to get the best of her and she told Dave about it. Dave, having a soft spot Eileen, covered for her and agreed to work several shifts in the bar. When Sam Taylor arrived in Charnham, looking for Bar work in May 2004, little did Eileen know she was staring at the son she had given away. It wasn't until an argument caused by Sam's clumsiness that the truth was revealed. Lucy, who had taken a liking to Sam was disgusted when she found he was her half-brother. Eileen revealed to Sam that Mike was his father. On the day of Pete's trial, Mike turned up and attempted to rape Eileen, Dave and Lucy where quick to intervene. Mike lunged for Eileen but Lucy pushed him to the floor in the bathroom, causing his death. Pete, having been acquitted of Roy's murder came home to witness this and devised a plan to dump Mike's body at a footbridge. Mike's body was found and Eileen was forced to come clean to Sam, who lied to the police to protect her. Eileen then found herself at the mercy of a stalker who had known of her plot; It turned out it was none other than her old friend Trish Wallace, who had also dated Mike when they were younger. It transpired that Trish had been seeing Mike while living in Hastings and fallen pregnant but had miscarried. Trish then proceeded to get Pete onside and provided him with the tape of Eileen confessing to frame Pete. This culminated in Pete throwing Eileen in the River Thames on their first wedding anniversary, after playing the tape back to her. Eileen and Pete were separated for several weeks with Pete having an affair with barmaid Katie Williams and Eileen seeking refuge with Dave and had a little fling. Both these affairs fizzled out once Pete and Eileen realised they loved each other.

That Summer, Trish returned with the news that she was pregnant. Eileen figured out Pete was the father and agreed to make a deal with Trish about the baby. Pete had always wanted a baby with Eileen but Eileen had suffered several miscarriages. Trish began manipulating things and stirring up trouble for the Callans. Trish eventually gave birth to a baby boy, Thomas. In September 2005, on the day of Thomas' christening, Trish appeared upstairs at the pub with a gun and held the Callans and Katie hostage. Pete managed to wrestle the gun away from Trish and shoot her with it. Worse was to come when S019 officers stormed the pub and ordered Pete to drop the gun. Pete took a shot at the police and was killed for his trouble. Eileen was left depressed as Pete had died and left her with nothing and everything to his two sons, Davie and Thomas. To repay Pete for this, Eileen flushed his ashes down the toilet. After Thomas had been taken into care following Trish's arrest, Eileen's mental state went from bad to worse, alienating many locals including her friend, Chrissy Costello. One night that October, Eileen set fire to the pub. Everyone had feared she committed suicide, but she was alive and well. Eileen decided to bid farewell to Charnham after getting in contact with her brother in Australia.

Two months later on New Year's Eve (The series' final episode), Eileen returned to Charnham having won the lottery and purchased two houses in Chigwell, one for her and one for her friend Chrissy and her family.
