= Gabby Johnson =

Gabby Johnson may refer to the following fictional characters:

- Gabby Johnson in Family Affairs, the British soap opera
- Gabby Johnson, in the 1974 film Blazing Saddles
