= Roy Farmer =

- Family Affairs character
- Portrayed by: Miles Petit
- Duration: 1997–2003
- First appearance: Episode 1; 30 March 1997
- Last appearance: Episode 1739; 27 November 2003
- Created by: Mal Young
In-universe information
- Occupation: Internet café owner
- Father: Vince Farmer
- Mother: Shirley Farmer
- Stepmother: Fern Farmer
- Wife: Melanie Hart (1999); Nikki Warrington (2003)

Roy Farmer is a fictional character from the Channel 5 soap opera Family Affairs, played by Miles Petit. He first appeared during the first episode on 30 March 1997, and departed on 27 November 2003. Roy was the show's longest-running original character.

== Casting ==
During his tenure at Family Affairs Petit shadowed directors in order to direct episodes while still appearing as Roy.

== Development ==
In 2000, following his character mellowing, Petit told a Soaplife reporter that "I want [Roy] to become a really evil, murderous bastard who's completely lost his marbles - again."

Roy begins a relationship with Claire Toomey (Tina Hall) and she uses him for financial gain in their business. Roy begins to develop feelings for eighteen-year-old friend Sara Warrington (Beth Cordingly). Petit told Sally Brockway from Soaplife that he did not understand how Roy managed to resist Sara's continuous advances. Roy does not feel able to be with Sara due to their age difference. He believes her to be vulnerable and he thought himself a father figure. He offered her guidance and understanding over their shared pasts of drug addiction. Petit added "Sara's still very immature and has never had a proper relationship. Roy sees her feeling for him as some schoolgirl crush and thinks he'd be taking advantage if he succumbed. He's been very strong because he's smitten with her.

Meanwhile Claire does not want Sara around because she is aware of Roy's feelings before he knew himself. Petit believed that Roy cares about Claire but cannot continue a relationship when he loves Sara. He added "he was never in love with Claire, I think it was just a convenience thing. It certainly helped him get over Maria, anyway."

== Storylines ==
Initially a close friend of Duncan Hart (Rocky Marshall), Roy soon fell into the clutches of villain Pete Callan (David Easter) who set him up dealing in drugs. Roy soon became addicted to the drugs he was selling, before kicking the habit and dissolving his association with Pete who he now hated. He later started romancing Duncan's sister Melanie Hart (Cordelia Bujega) but was disapproved-of due to his drug-dealing history and former association with the hated Pete. In an attempt to break-up the relationship, Melanie's sister Holly Hart (Sandra Huggett) planted drugs in Roy's jacket and informed the police. Roy was charged with drug possession. After being made homeless and living rough he got his life in order again, eventually becoming engaged to Melanie. However tragedy struck hours after their wedding in January 1999 when Melanie and her entire family were killed in a gas explosion that tore through the boat on which the wedding reception was being held. Roy, who had earlier disembarked the boat to get a hangover cure for Jamie Hart (Michael Cole), was the only member of the wedding party to have survived the blast.

He became mentally unbalanced after this loss; adopting army dress, killing and adopting a pigeon he named "Pete," shaved his head and later kidnapped and attempted to murder Claire Toomey (Tina Hall) which he should have been arrested and spent time in prison for. He eventually got his life in order again and started romances with Claire, Maria Simons (Annie Miles) and Sara Warrington (Beth Cordingly). He later opened an internet cafe business on Stanley Street in Charnham, and started a new romance with Nikki Warrington (Rebecca Blake) after her engagement ended. They were later married, and had a child.

Ironically, Roy himself died in a fire whilst trying to rescue Nikki; a fire caused by an arson attack which destroyed his internet cafe business in 2003. At the time he left the series he was the second to last remaining original cast member. At that time he was the only character in the series to have appeared continuously since its debut. The other original character at that time, Claire Toomey (Tina Hall), had taken a long break from the series.

== Reception ==
A Soaplife reporter described him as a quiet businessman with a coloured history. They added "to look at him now, you'd never guess Roy Farmer had such a chequered past."
