= Brian Cowan =

British actor (1962–2021)

Brian Cowan (1962 – January 2021) was a British actor, known for his role as Robert Davenport in the long running soap opera, Family Affairs. He starred in Taggart from 1993 to 2005 as DCS Brian Holmes, the partner of Blythe Duff's character, DS Jackie Reid. He was also known for playing Murray Crozier from 2010 to 2014 in the Scottish soap River City. He quit acting in 2014 to become a celebrant.

Cowan's body was discovered on 2 January 2021 in Falkirk, Scotland. It is believed he died of natural causes.
