= Family Affairs =

British soap opera

- Genre: Soap opera
- Created by: Mal Young
- Starring: List of characters
- Country of origin: United Kingdom
- Original language: English
- No. of episodes: Pilot + 2,285 regular episodes & 1 special

Production
- Running time: 30 minutes (including advertisements)
- Production companies: Thames Television; Grundy UK (1997–2001)

Original release
- Network: Channel 5
- Release: 30 March 1997 – 30 December 2005

Family Affairs is a British soap opera that aired on Channel 5. It debuted on 30 March 1997, the day of the launch of said channel and was the first programme broadcast on the channel. It was screened as five thirty-minute episodes per week at 6:30pm on weekdays, followed by an omnibus edition on Sundays. The series never achieved high ratings, so it went through a number of dramatic revamps involving wholesale cast turnover. The premise of the series was also refocused from a family in a quiet suburb just outside London, to a range of different people living on a bustling outer London street.

The series was shot on video and given a film look. In 1999 and 2004, single episodes used standard video presentation for testing purposes. On 2 August 2005, Channel 5 announced they would not renew Family Affairs. Production ceased on 4 November, and the final episode was broadcast on 30 December 2005. Producer Sean O'Connor changed to standard video presentation from September 2005 until the final episode.

== History ==
=== Original format ===
The serial originally focused on the Hart and Gates family and some of their friends and close associates living in the fictional outer London suburb of Charnham. The Hart family consisted of builder Chris (Ian Ashpitel), his wife Annie (Liz Crowther) and their four children: ladies' man Duncan (Rocky Marshall); his twin sister, trainee solicitor and confused virgin Holly (Sandra Huggett); feisty Melanie, who became a police officer (Cordelia Bugeja); and schoolboy Jamie (Michael Cole). Annie gave birth to a fifth child during the series, Sam.

Chris and Annie's parents were also featured. After losing his wife Sally (Jean Heywood) in the opening episodes, Chris's father Angus (Ian Cullen) came to live with the family. Annie's parents, staunchly conservative Elsa Gates (Delena Kidd) and philandering Jack (Kenneth Farrington), lived nearby.

Other original characters were Chris's partner in their building business, Nick Trip (Barry McCormick); Melanie's bubbly best friend Claire Toomey (Tina Hall); Annie's baby-obsessed friend Maria Simons (Annie Miles) and Duncan's loyal drinking partners Tim Webster (Idris Elba) and Roy Farmer (Miles Petit).

The action took place in a series of modern, middle-class houses and spacious apartments whose geographic relation to one another was not clearly defined by the series. The primary meeting place for characters was The Lock, a slick bar/restaurant located in Charnham's riverside marina district. The expansive parklands and forested areas of Charnham Common were also frequently visited by characters.

Later in 1997, Maria's ex-husband, the callous Pete Callan, appeared in town. Pete, played by ex-Brookside actor David Easter, provided the series with a much-needed villain, and he quickly became the show's standout character. Pete soon married Claire Toomey, who had been deserted by Duncan after giving birth to his twin children.

Another early arrival was the sassy bisexual Susie Ross (Tina Landini), who took a job at The Lock and romanced both Duncan and his twin sister Holly. Nick's troublesome teenage son Liam (Stephen Hoyle) arrived, and neighbourhood nosey parker Bill Cockerill (Roger Sloman) and his wife Samantha (Tessa Wyatt), along with their daughter Charlotte, made several appearances.

Liam became involved in a post office robbery. His lawyer was Pamela Hargreaves (Sandy Hendrickse), and she soon embarked on a romance with Liam's father Nick. Pete Callan then bought The Lock, further cementing his importance to the series. Entrepreneur Peter Stringfellow even made a guest appearance in one episode.

=== Revamp ===
By mid-1998, the programme's middling ratings prompted the show's makers to drastically revamp the series. Brian Park, famous for his overhaul of ITV's Coronation Street, was appointed as Family Affairs' new producer and was tasked with remodelling the series. It was decided that the majority of the regular characters would be written out – including all members of Hart and Gates families.

Duncan Hart was the first notable departure. Disillusioned with life in Charnham, he left to start a new life overseas. Maria initially went with him, along with his son, Ewan, who Claire had left unsupervised and they lived off the money she had obtained by selling 50% of The Lock to Jack. He had bought into the business, believing they were about to rekindle their relationship, when in fact her plan was to always leave with Duncan. The relationship didn't work out and Maria returned in the autumn, to an initial frosty reception, and gave baby Ewan back to Claire.

Throughout 1998, Tim, Susie and Liam departed, and the recurring Cockerill couple was phased out. Pamela's romance with Nick developed and her mother, lovable but meddling gossip Sadie Hargreaves (Barbara Young), entered the storyline. Lovable rogue Dave Matthews (Richard Hawley), his brassy chain-smoking wife Cat (Nicola Duffett), and Dave's son from an earlier marriage Josh (Terry Burns) moved in. Dave was an extramarital love interest for Annie Hart, before falling in love with her daughter Holly.

Also introduced was Dusty McHugh (Doreen Ingleton), the strident owner of the local mini supermarket, and her children, mouthy daughter Yasmin (Ebony Thomas) and conscientious son Benji (Junior Laniyan). The McHughs lived in a flat above their shop, and the adjacent flat was occupied by students Declan Byrne (Quentin Jones), Gabby Johnson (Emma Linley) and Clive Starr (Huw Bevan). Clive's older brother Dudley (David Verrey), also known as Serge Pompidou, became the new chef at The Lock, and was soon joined there by vapid barmaid Siobhan Jones (Jemma Walker).

Yasmin, known for her ostentatious facial piercings, quickly started a relationship with Josh Matthews. Clive was revealed to be gay, and secretly in love with flatmate Declan. Dudley/Serge embarked on a romance with Maria, and the pair were soon married - with Serge wrongly believing Maria was pregnant.

=== Gates and Hart families depart ===
In late 1998, Jack Gates crashed his car on an isolated road while driving drunk. The incident knocked his wife Elsa unconscious; Jack placed her in the driver's seat before anyone arrived at the scene and blamed her for the crash. Elsa suffered amnesia during her subsequent recuperation, and Jack kept her isolated from family for fear that their support or inquiries could trigger the return of her memory and uncover the truth. As Elsa gradually regained her independence, Jack began to convince her - and everyone else - she was going senile. When Elsa's memory did begin to return, she confronted him. There was a struggle and Elsa fell, badly injuring herself. Jack then smothered her with a pillow and staged her death to look like an accident.

Now widowed, Jack tried to reignite his relationship with Maria, who rebuffed him. Now suspecting Elsa's death was not an accident, Maria tricked Jack into admitting what really happened on recorded camera, with Annie secretly listening from the next room. When the camcorder unexpectedly made a noise, Jack realized he'd been set up. Now rejected by his family and facing the rest of his life in prison, Jack changed his will to make Pete Callan his chief beneficiary, and committed suicide by gassing himself in his car.

On 29 January 1999, the entire Hart family (except for Duncan) were killed. After Roy and Melanie's wedding, the Harts conducted a small reception on their river boat. After Roy left the boat to retrieve a hangover cure for Jamie, a fallen candle ignited leaking gas. The resultant explosion killed all on board, just as Chris learnt of Annie's affair with Dave Matthews, who Holly was planning to leave Charnham with.

=== New direction ===
Immediately, the show's theme tune and opening titles were revamped to reflect the serial's new direction. They now deployed flashes of a tube journey to Charnham Station, linking Charnham with the city of London. Over this, shots of the remaining and newly introduced characters shown.

Roy suffered emotional trauma after the loss of Melanie, kidnapping Claire Callan and threatening to kill her. After her rescue, she left Charnham and Roy recovered.

Maria Starr announced her pregnancy, while refusing to let Dudley/Serge anywhere near her or to even share the same bed for many months. She was actually faking the pregnancy and wearing a cushion under her dress. Disguised by a dark wig, Maria stole a baby from a maternity hospital and brought it home, attempting to pass it off as her own child. The truth quickly came out and the baby returned to its real parents, who chose to not press charges.

Pamela defended new client Simon Thornton (Valentine Pelka), who was accused of rape. She was convinced of his innocence so didn't fully investigate his background, but later learned he had kept vital facts about previous convictions from her. Realising he was guilty, Pamela dropped the case and resigned from her job, but Simon started stalking her. Pamela accidentally killed Simon with an iron during a confrontation at his home. Fearing her claims of self-defence would not be believed, she enlisted Sadie's help to bury Simon's body on Charnham Common. Racked with guilt for several months, Pamela and Sadie exhibited strange behaviour which puzzled Nick, who had proposed to Pamela during this time.

Nick and Pamela were married at The Lock. The marriage was short-lived, as Simon's body was found and Pamela was arrested and imprisoned for murder. Pamela took full blame and insisted Sadie had not assisted, ensuring Sadie's freedom. Nick left town shortly afterwards.

Benjie McHugh began a love affair with his married teacher Maggie Roswell (Robyn Moore), and eventually went on the run together with Maggie's two sons. Maggie was killed in a car accident while fleeing from her husband.

Clive Starr accepted that Declan was straight and there could be no romance between them, moving on to Adam Sheldrake (Vince Leigh). Adam was a policeman, who was in the closet for fear that being bisexual could affect his career. Adam soon found himself attracted to Clive's flatmate Gabby Johnson. Adam's ex-wife and daughter then arrived, further complicating Adam's relationship with Clive and his affair with Gabby.

Siobhan Jones became closely associated with Pete Callan, then her sister Julie-Ann moved in. Julie-Ann started pursuing Pete, an endeavour which ended with the revelation that Pete was actually her father.

For several months after the revamp, the existing locations of Maria Starr's flat, Pete Callan's flat, the marina and The Lock continued to be featured. Dave and Cat moved into the former Gates residence. Despite the new tube station opening sequence, the exterior shots of the show's locales the frequently visited Charnham Common suggested that Charnham was a modern, green, and spacious small town.

New characters continued to join. One arrival was the Derwin family - censorious Fern Derwin (Belinda Sinclair), easy-going taxi-driver Max (Nick Stringer) and their rebellious foster son Arlo Dean (Ash Newman). The Derwins soon fostered the troubled and sensitive Gemma Craig (Angela Hazeldine) who had recently lost her entire family. Meanwhile, Josh Matthews pursued a singing career, enlisting a manager (played by Jonathan Coleman) and recording a CD, which didn't sell.

The departures of Claire Callan, Nick Trip and then Maria Starr left Roy Farmer as the show's only remaining original character. Pamela Trip and Dudley Starr/Serge Pompidou had also departed. Dusty McHugh emigrated to Jamaica, leaving Yasmin and Benji – and the shop – in the care of her sister-in-law Pearl (Doña Croll). Dusty returned briefly for a Christmas visit. It was later reported she had been killed in a car accident in Jamaica.

Six months after his introduction, Max Derwin died of a heart attack during an argument with Arlo. Fern discovered that he Max left everything in his will to an illegitimate son, Maxwell, from a relationship with another woman. Claire Callan returned to the series in 2000, hardened by her disastrous marriage to Pete. She had left the twins with her sister.

=== Stanley Street ===
In 2000, coinciding with the introduction of the Warrington family, the geographic focus of the series was retconned to Stanley Street, in the fictitious West London W15 postal district. Previously, the specific location of Charnham had never been explicitly stated; it was known to be close to a river (actually the Grand Union Canal at Yeading), and characters sometimes travelled to Maidenhead. With the late-1998 infusion of new characters, it was established Dusty and her children lived over their minimarket and that in the next door flat were students Declan, Gabby and Clive. Now, we would see action regularly extend to the shop's street exterior and the surrounding buildings, and this location was revealed to be the bustling Stanley Street with its row of narrow shopfronts and terraced houses. Just as Roy was establishing his new Internet café business, next door to Yasmin's mini-supermarket, the Warringtons moved in across the street. Roy came to live in the street as well, and when Pete Callan sold The Lock to buy an old-style pub, The Black Swan, this too was revealed to be on the same short street.

In quick succession, any regular characters not already living there soon moved into Stanley Street, while Sadie's home inexplicably shifted there without her having to move house. After this, various locations seen earlier in the series – such as The Lock and the marina – would not be seen again. Alongside Yasmin's minimarket and the newly opened Internet café, The Black Swan would become one of the show's primary meeting places, despite the fact that landlord Pete Callan was openly hated by most of his neighbours. From now on, most outdoor taping was on the Stanley Street set, reducing the number of time-consuming location shoots while confining much of the action to one place.

Many storylines now focussed around Pete Callan and his various nefarious activities. Meanwhile, the large group of younger characters in the series went through a series of romantic entanglements. The newly introduced Warrington family became key figures in the show's on-going storylines; Nikki Warrington (Rebecca Blake) endured problems in her marriage and her large blended family, which consisted of her doctor husband Andrew (Simon Cook), his children Luke (Royce Cronin) and Sara (Beth Cordingly), and Nikki's children Becky (Chandra Reugg) and Darren (Joe Fox, later Ike Hamilton) from her previous marriage to incarcerated Adrian Scott (Ariyon Bakare).

Nikki became embroiled in scandal when she embarked upon an affair with her stepson Luke. This played alongside Pete Callan's latest misdemeanour – framing new wife Siobhan for the murder of Josh Matthews. Siobhan had struck a blow to a suspected burglar in the darkened kitchen upstairs at the pub, where she lived with Pete, before realising the "burglar" was merely barman Josh Matthews. Siobhan falsely believed that her blow to Josh had killed him, when it had actually just knocked him unconscious; Pete, who was on the scene in seconds and harboured a deep-seated entity with Josh's father Dave, secretly delivered the deadly blow after Siobhan left in terror. Siobhan was quickly arrested and sent to prison.

=== 2001 ===
In 2001, the Warrington clan was extended to include their relatives, the Webb and Ellis families: Nikki's brother Matt Ellis (Matthew Jay Lewis), his girlfriend Karen (Tanya Franks) and Karen's brothers Jim (Joe Dow) and Paul Webb (Martin Delaney).

With their storylines gradually dwindling, Gabby Johnson and Clive Starr quietly departed. The places in their flat were taken by a succession of attractive young residents, including Polly Arnold (Juliet Cowan) and Dr Tanya Ayuba (Laila Rouass). Polly romanced Declan Byrne, but when her brother Gavin (Neil Roberts) arrived in town, she resumed her incestuous love affair with him, resulting in a disgusted Declan leaving Charnham. The establishment of a youth refuge on the street angered some residents, although Roy Farmer soon became a highly involved volunteer on the project. Jim Webb became Cat Matthews's reluctant second husband.

Paul Webb paired up with Gemma Craig, who continued to live with her well-meaning but increasingly meddlesome foster mother Fern. Fern had married Roy's father Vince (Stephen Yardley).

Karen Ellis embarked upon a controversial lesbian affair with her child's surrogate mother, Sadie's Australian niece Kelly Hurst (Nicky Talacko). This storyline also featured the brief appearance of Kelly's father and Sadie's brother-in-law Barry (Antony Booth). At Christmas, Paul Webb discovered that Jim was not his brother, but his father.

=== 2002 ===
In 2002, Cat Webb's niece Geri (Anna Acton) moved to Stanley Street, as did the troubled Davenport family, who moved into the flat originally occupied by Declan, Gabby and Clive. Mother Ginny (Joanna Foster) was recovering from a severe bout of depression, and husband Robert (Brian Cowan) worked to launch a catering business on Stanley Street. Their three teenage children Jessica (Sammy Glenn), Cameron (Rupert Hill) and Lewis (Sam Stockman) were soon joined by Robert's much younger adoptive brother Jude Davenport. Jude was openly despised by Ginny, Cameron and Lewis after he romantically pursued Jessica. Cameron and Paul Webb became close friends, until Paul learned of Cameron's brief affair with his fiancée Gemma. A furious Paul left Gemma at the altar and left Charnham.

Charlotte Day (Leanne Lakey) arrived and began working at the Black Swan, quickly becoming a love interest for Pete Callan. She was later joined by her younger sister Lucy (Julia Lee Smith) and their mother Eileen (Rosie Rowell). After Charlotte's departure, Eileen and Lucy continued in the series, becoming involved in several highly dramatic events. Eileen soon became Pete Callan's fourth wife after his divorce from Siobhan.

Peter England joined as Ben Galloway, who lived in the halfway house and worked in Roy Farmer's Internet café. Ben's storyline progressed to a point where Ben admitted he was gay and shared the first gay kiss on British daytime TV.

Meanwhile, Yasmin and Benji's aunt Pearl moved away, and a guilt-racked Siobhan Callan endured prison and a lengthy court case after being framed for Josh's murder. She was eventually released and returned to Charnham, where she and others slowly began to piece the truth together, although nothing could be proved and Pete got away with the murder. Siobhan departed in 2002, after Pete caused a car crash that injured her killed Kate Matherson (Mary Stockley).

Robert Davenport had a one-night stand with Geri, after which she accused him of rape. He went to trial but was acquitted. The stress led to the break-up of his marriage, resulting in Ginny moving to France with Jessica. Jude Davenport also moved away.

=== 2003 cast revamp ===
In September 2003, another drastic cast revamp occurred as new series producer Alison Davis arrived, presented with the task of finally getting viewing figures up to an acceptable standard.

Paul Webb left after his portrayer, Martin Delaney, left the series to take a role in New Zealand serial Shortland Street. Following Paul's departure all members of the related Webb, Warrington and Ellis families were gradually phased out.

Robert Davenport and co-worker Fern Farmer were killed when a runaway car ploughed into the shopfront of Robert's catering business. The driver was Dave Matthews's recently arrived stepson Jake Walker (Seb Castang), who lost control of the stolen car during a police chase following a botched deal by Gabriel Drummond. The biggest casualty of Davis's arrival was the show's only remaining original character, Roy Farmer, who was killed in a fire at his Internet café business.

These departures left just a handful of old characters on board, with Pete, Sadie, Yasmin, Cat and the returning Dave as the only pre-2002 characters remaining in the show (Pete had joined in 1997, the others in late-1998). Pete was now the show's longest-serving character. Pete and Eileen Day had married, although she had actually married him for strategic reasons in a long-term plan for revenge. In league with the sinister Mike Shaw (Tony O'Callaghan), Eileen had started the fire that killed Roy, in an attempt to frame Pete for arson. No one knew Roy was inside when the fire was set; when Pete was arrested, the charge was arson and murder. Pete was sent to prison on remand and was absent for many months, seen in isolated episodes where other characters visited him in prison. He eventually returned to the storyline with his trial, ending in his acquittal, return to Charnham and to running the pub with Eileen, who had become licensee while he was in custody.

On Pete's first day back, one of his tasks was to dispose of Mike Shaw's corpse; in an incident, somewhat similar to the death of Josh Matthews, Mike was accidentally killed by Pete's stepdaughter Lucy after he had tried to rape Eileen. Sam Taylor (Leon Ockenden), Eileen's son from a previous relationship with Mike, arrived. Pete secretly learned that Eileen and Mike had set the fire in an attempt to frame him for arson, and he plotted a slow and satisfying revenge against Eileen.

Another series of new characters were brought in to remould Family Affairs once again. Gary Costello (Gary Webster), a businessman who lost his fortune in a failed business deal, was forced to move from Chigwell to the comparatively modest Stanley Street, much to the shame and embarrassment of his snobbish, socialite wife Chrissie (Kazia Pelka). Their daughters Melanie (Rebecca Hunter) and Chloe (Leah Coombes), were more concerned about leaving behind their school friends. They were later joined by Gary's dependable mother Myra (Kate Williams).

The fractious Boulter family opened a restaurant on the site of Roy's destroyed café. Moody, judgemental Les and his nurturing wife Denise harboured a secret about a long-ago affair. Their son Brendan was a closeted bisexual; their teenage daughter was the bright Kelly. Also moving in was nurse Tanya Woods (Carol Starks) and her gay best friend Sean Steel (Sam Barriscale). Doug MacKenzie (Gareth Hale) became Cat Webb's third husband, while his womanising son Marc (Michael Wildman; later Graham Bryan) married Yasmin. Doug's younger son and Marc's half-brother Justin (Ryan Davenport) provided comic relief as the local clown. He and Kelly Boulter had a romance that led to an unplanned pregnancy. Kelly went on to have the child, and the couple began living together.

=== Later storylines ===
With the new cast members in place, storylines in 2004 focused on the new characters through several major storylines. During one of many marital upsets in the Costello household, daughter Chloe retreated upstairs and rifled through older sister Melanie's possessions, only to find a stash of MDMA; she subsequently took several of the pills and wound up in hospital. Tests revealed the source of the illness, but also suggested she might also have cancer, and further tests were ordered. In the public outpouring of sympathy and support for the family, Chrissie finally found acceptance in the neighbourhood. When tests showed Chloe did not have cancer, Chrissie kept it quiet and convinced Chloe to maintain a pretence of illness as a "little game". Unfortunately, the lie took hold, leading to many months of Chrissie deceiving the community and her own family, convincing everyone that Chloe was undergoing chemotherapy. When Eileen Callan saw them out shopping when Chloe was purportedly in hospital, and after picking up on other hints, she voiced her suspicion that Chrissie was faking Chloe's illness. The community was aghast and ostracized Eileen for several weeks. Chrissie's pretence continued for a few more weeks, until a suspicious Tanya removed Chloe's bandages to reveal that there were no injection wounds at all.

Tanya herself was pregnant to Sean; as platonic friends with little prospect of parenthood presenting itself, they planned to become parents together and Tanya underwent in vitro fertilisation. Brendan Boulter became engaged to Melanie Costello married her while conducting an affair with Sean. Denise Boulter had been largely ostracised by her outraged daughter and husband after the truth about her long-ago affair came to light. However, they eventually reconciled their differences, although Brendan would leave town to escape his own problems.

Gary and Chrissie's marriage had faltered, leading to their separation, but the family endured its lowest ebb when Chloe Costello was sexually abused by family friend Bradley Foster (Harry Capehorn). The Boulter's marriage was again tested when Denise was raped by an unseen assailant, accusing local taxi driver Graham Harker (Lee Warburton) of the crime despite a total lack of evidence, and the Boulter family began hounding him to seek revenge. Graham started a romance with Melanie, who became his sole supporter.

Gary and Chrissie Costello reconciled and Gary proposed on Christmas Eve 2004. Melanie had earlier refused to attend their remarriage ceremony due to clashes with her parents over her relationship with Graham; on the day of the ceremony, Melanie learned that their suspicions had been correct and that he was a dangerous rapist, when he held her captive in his flat. Melanie was able to enlist Denise's help escaping from Graham. These events would see him brought to justice, although repercussions from these events would also lead to the Boulter's marriage disintegrating, and Les and Denise both leaving Charnham.

At The Black Swan, psychotic Trish Wallace (Gabrielle Glaister) emerged as a recurring villain capable of rivalling Pete Callan. An unnerved Eileen was being blackmailed by someone who threatened to reveal to Pete that Eileen had framed him for arson; Pete already knew this, and the Callans endured several tumultuous plot twists as they schemed and plotted against each other. This culminated in the 2000th episode in late-2004, when Pete threw Eileen into the River Thames. Pete's eventual comeuppance followed an armed showdown between Pete, Trish and Eileen in September 2005. Pete was shot dead after a shootout with S019 Officers, in a final act of suicide by cop.

Several other characters, including Sadie, Dave and Lucy, were written out of the series as Alison Davis ended her reign, to be replaced by ex-Hollyoaks producer Sean O'Connor. O'Connor quickly outlined his plans for the show, including a name change and many younger, more glamorous characters (which threatened to turn the soap into a Hollyoaks clone). However, his plans were cut short by the announcement that Channel 5 would not be renewing the series for 2006. This timing resulted in numerous barely-known characters populating the final episode.

=== Final episode ===
The final episode of Family Affairs was broadcast on 30 December 2005 in the UK, and on 29 June 2006 in Australia and New Zealand. 1.3 million people tuned in to watch the final in the UK.

The episode revolved mainly around the lead up to the Stanley Street New Year's Eve party and the wedding of newcomers Nathan and Eve Fletcher. Eileen Callan returned and announced she had won the lottery and was now very wealthy. Eileen sold The Black Swann to Rex Randell and bought a house for the Costello family. Yasmin and Damian kissed and announced they were a couple. Dr Hector Price and George finally became a couple after a falling out with nurse and flatmate Meredith. Babs Woods's long-time boyfriend Howard returned.

Hester is murdered by her brother, Rex Randell, after his barmaid Katie saw footage of Rex murdering his late wife. After the murder, Rex faced up to Katie; the outcome of the showdown was not shown. Doug split from his long-term wife Cat.

The final scene saw most of the other characters celebrating the New Year.

== Cast and characters ==
| Character | Actor | Duration |
|---|---|---|
| Caleb Andrews | Steve Toussaint | 2004 |
| Gavin Arnold | Neil Roberts | 2001 |
| Polly Arnold | Juliet Cowan | 2000–2001 |
| Tanya Ayuba | Laila Rouass | 2000–2001 |
| Cheryl Barker | Cathy Murphy | 2003–2004 |
| Brendan Boulter | Steven Burrell | 2003–2004 |
| Denise Boulter | Clare Perkins | 2003–2005 |
| Kelly Boulter | Carryl Thomas | 2003–2005 |
| Les Boulter | Howard Saddler | 2003–2005 |
| Conor Byrne | Glenn Mulhern | 2000 |
| Declan Byrne | Quentin Jones | 1999–2001 |
| Eileen Callan | Rosie Rowell | 2002–2005 |
| Pete Callan | David Easter | 1997–2005 |
| Siobhan Callan | Jemma Walker | 1998–2002 |
| Madge Bennet | Heather Chasen | 2005 |
| William Cockerill | Roger Sloman | 1997–1999 |
| Chloe Costello | Leah Coombes | 2003–2005 |
| Chrissy Costello | Kazia Pelka | 2003–2005 |
| Gary Costello | Gary Webster | 2003–2005 |
| Melanie Costello | Rebecca Hunter | 2003–2005 |
| Myra Costello | Kate Williams | 2003–2005 |
| Gemma Craig | Angela Hazeldine | 1999–2003 |
| Cameron Davenport | Rupert Hill | 2002–2004 |
| Ginny Davenport | Joanna Foster | 2002–2003 |
| Jessica Davenport | Samantha Glenn | 2002–2003 |
| Jude Davenport | Daniel Jackson | 2002 |
| Lewis Davenport | Sam Stockman | 2002–2004 |
| Robert Davenport | Brian Cowan | 2002–2003 |
| Charlotte Day | Leanne Lakey | 2002 |
| Lucy Day | Julia Lee Smith | 2002–2005 |
| Arlo Dean | Asier Cebeira | 1999–2000 |
| Max Derwin | Nick Stringer | 1999 |
| Gabriel Drummond | Roger Griffiths | 2002–2003 |
| Karen Ellis | Tanya Franks | 2000–2003 |
| Matt Ellis | Matthew Jay Lewis | 2000–2003 |
| Geri Evans | Anna Acton | 2002–2005 |
| Fern Farmer | Belinda Sinclair | 1999–2003 |
| Melanie Farmer | Cordelia Budeja | 1997–1999 |
| Roy Farmer | Miles Petit | 1997–2003 |
| Vince Farmer | Stephen Yardley | 1999–2003 |
| School Headmaster | John Fox | 1997 |
| George Fitzgerald | Florence Hoath | 2005 |
| Barbara Fletcher | Kay Adshead | 1997–1999 |
| Nathan Fletcher | Felix Scott | 2005 |
| Bradley Foster | Harry Capehorn | 2004–2005 |
| Ben Galloway | Peter England | 2003–2004 |
| Elsa Gates | Delena Kidd | 1997–1998 |
| Jack Gates | Ken Farrington | 1997–1998 |
| Adam Green | Ben Hull | 2005 |
| Yasmin Green | Ebony Thomas | 1998–2005 |
| Pamela Hargreaves | Sandra Hendrickse | 1997–1999 |
| Pamela Hargreaves | Caroline O'Neill | 2005 |
| Sadie Hargreaves | Barbara Young | 1998–2005 |
| Graham Harker | Lee Warburton | 2005 |
| Damian Harrison | Richard Frame | 2005 |
| Angus Hart | Ian Cullen | 1997–1999 |
| Annie Hart | Liz Crowther | 1997–1999 |
| Chris Hart | Ian Ashpitel | 1997–1999 |
| Duncan Hart | Rocky Marshall | 1997–1998 |
| Duncan Hart | Jonathan Wrather | 2000 |
| Helen Hart | Janice McKenzie | 1997–1998 |
| Holly Hart | Sandra Huggett | 1997–1999 |
| Jamie Hart | Michael Cole | 1997–1999 |
| Sally Hart | Jean Heywood | 1997 |
| Belinda Heath | Glynis Barber | 2005 |
| Barry Hurst | Antony Booth | 2001 |
| Gloria Hurst | Joanna Wake | 2001–2002 |
| Kelly Hurst | Nicky Talacko | 2001–2002 |
| Sharon Ingram | Kim Taylforth | 2004–2005 |
| Gabby Johnson | Emma Linley | 1999–2000 |
| Julie-Ann Jones | Chloe Howman | 1999–2000 |
| Max Lawson | Marcus D'Amico | 2005 |
| Meredith Lovechild | Perdita Avery | 2005 |
| Cat MacKenzie | Nicola Duffett | 1998–2005 |
| Doug MacKenzie | Gareth Hale | 2003–2005 |
| Justin MacKenzie | Ryan Davenport | 2003–2005 |
| Marc MacKenzie | Michael Wildman | 2003–2004 |
| Marc MacKenzie | Graham Bryan | 2005 |
| Rosa Marshall | Ginny Holder | 2002 |
| Josh Matthews | Terry Burns | 1998–2000 |
| Dave Matthews | Richard Hawley | 1998–2005 |
| Benji McHugh | Junior Laniyan | 1998–2001 |
| Benji McHugh | Mark McLean | 2002–2003 |
| Dusty McHugh | Doreen Ingleton | 1998–1999 |
| Pearl McHugh | Doña Croll | 1999–2002 |
| Eve O'Brien | Zara Dawson | 2005 |
| Brett Owen | Spencer McLaren | 2005 |
| Deke Pascal | Darren Saul | 2001–2002 |
| Ziggy Pascal | Roger Davies | 2001–2002 |
| Hector Price | Andrew Hinton-Brown | 2005 |
| Hester Randall | Katherine Kanter | 2005 |
| Rex Randall | John Hopkins | 2005 |
| Alex Renshaw | Roman Marek | 2001–2002 |
| Daniel Renshaw | Andrew McKay | 2001–2002 |
| Linda Renshaw | Alison Newman | 2001 |
| Susie Ross | Tina Landini | 1997–1998 |
| Adrian Scott | Ariyon Bakare | 2000–2001 |
| Becky Scott | Chandra Ruegg | 2000–2003 |
| Darren Scott | Ike Hamilton | 2001–2003 |
| George Shackleford | Miles Anderson | 2001–2002 |
| Joan Shackleford | Margi Clarke | 2001–2002 |
| Tom Shackleford | Mark Healy | 2001–2002 |
| Aamina Shafiq | Souad Faress | 2005 |
| Sami Shafiq | Hosh Kane | 2005 |
| Mike Shaw | Tony O'Callaghan | 2003–2004 |
| Adam Sheldrake | Vince Leigh | 1999–2000 |
| Diane Short | Pooky Quesnel | 2001–2002 |
| Maria Simons | Annie Miles | 1997–2000 |
| Clive Starr | Huw Bevan | 1999–2001 |
| Dudley Starr | David Verney | 1999 |
| Sean Steel | Sam Barriscale | 2003–2005 |
| Olly Taylor | Alex Hardy | 2004–2005 |
| Sam Taylor | Leon Ockenden | 2004 |
| Liam Trip | Stephen Hoyle | 1997–1998 |
| Nick Trip | Barry McCormick | 1997–1999 |
| Claire Toomey | Tina Hall | 1997–1999, 2000–2003 |
| Jake Walker | Seb Castang | 2003–2005 |
| Trish Wallace | Gabrielle Glaister | 2004–2005 |
| Andrew Warrington | Simon Cook | 2000–2001 |
| Luisa Warrington | Clare Byam-Shaw | 2000–2001 |
| Luke Warrington | Royce Cronin | 2000–2002 |
| Nikki Warrington | Rebecca Blake | 2000–2003 |
| Sara Warrington | Beth Cordingly | 2000–2001 |
| Jim Webb | Jonathan Dow | 2000–2003 |
| Paul Webb | Martin Delaney | 2000–2003 |
| Tim Webster | Idris Elba | 1997–1998 |
| Coral Wilding | Katy Edwards | 2005 |
| Jason Wilding | Daniel Hyde | 2005 |
| Alex Williams | Jake McCarthy | 2004–2005 |
| Ania Williams | Elizabeth Holmes-Gwillim | 2004–2005 |
| Ben Williams | Adam Rhys Dee | 2005 |
| Conrad Williams | Simon Merrells | 2004–2005 |
| Katie Williams | Robyn Page | 2004–2005 |
| Babs Woods | Jan Harvey | 2004–2005 |
| Tanya Woods | Carol Starks | 2003–2005 |

== Storylines ==
The show generally concentrated on family-based storylines and marital upsets, although more extreme storylines involving murder, rape, prostitution, blackmail, drug use, and brother-sister incestuous relationships have also occurred. Perhaps, most significantly, Family Affairs has often been acclaimed for its constant inclusion of minority groups, having featured a higher density of gay and lesbian characters over its history than any other British soap. It has also been praised for its treatment and integration of characters from ethnic minorities, notable examples of which include the inimitable Yasmin, who had been with the show for seven years at its final episode in December, and the more recent addition of a gay Muslim character, Sami Shafiq (Hosh Kane).

Family Affairs also went to unprecedented lengths in its treatment of the controversial issue of child abuse; in 2005, the soap won its first British Soap Award for a storyline in which young Chloe Costello (Leah Coombes) was sexually abused by a family friend, Bradley Foster (Harry Capehorn). The storyline, backed by the NSPCC, aimed to destroy some unhelpful stereotypes about what most expect a paedophile to be like. Partly, as a result of the storyline, Kazia Pelka, who played Chloe's mother Chrissy, also won the award for Best Dramatic Performance, culminating in a double victory for the show.

== Production notes ==
Prior to the establishment of the outdoor Stanley Street set, most of the location footage was shot in West London. The Lock and its surrounding areas were filmed at Yeading Marina, shots of the town centre of Charnham were in Uxbridge, and wooded areas featured Ruislip, Denham and Iver among others. The houses seen in exterior shots were in Hayes, Uxbridge, and other parts of west London. The early episodes feature scenes shot near Wharncliffe Viaduct, a railway viaduct in Hanwell, west London.

Several episodes made heavy use of the police station sets of ITV1's police drama The Bill, made by the same TV production company. The words "Sun Hill" were removed from the front of the police station for the Family Affairs shoot. The hospital sets used for St Hugh's on The Bill were also used to represent hospital St. David's in Family Affairs.
