= Janice McKenzie =

English actress

Janice McKenzie is an English actress. She has appeared in Coronation Street as Mrs Paton (2000), Family Affairs as Helen Cooper (1997–1999) and most famously as Gloria Weaver in Emmerdale (2000–2004). She has since appeared in televised dramas such as Holby City (2005), The Royal (2006) and Doctors (2004, 2007), and was cast as Sonia Chance in Little Britain, although the role was ultimately reduced to an off-screen presence. However, she has been most active in theatre throughout her career.

She trained at the Guildhall School of Music and Drama and has worked in theatres throughout the UK. She has also been a teacher of English and Drama.
