= Beth Cordingly =

English actress (born 1976)

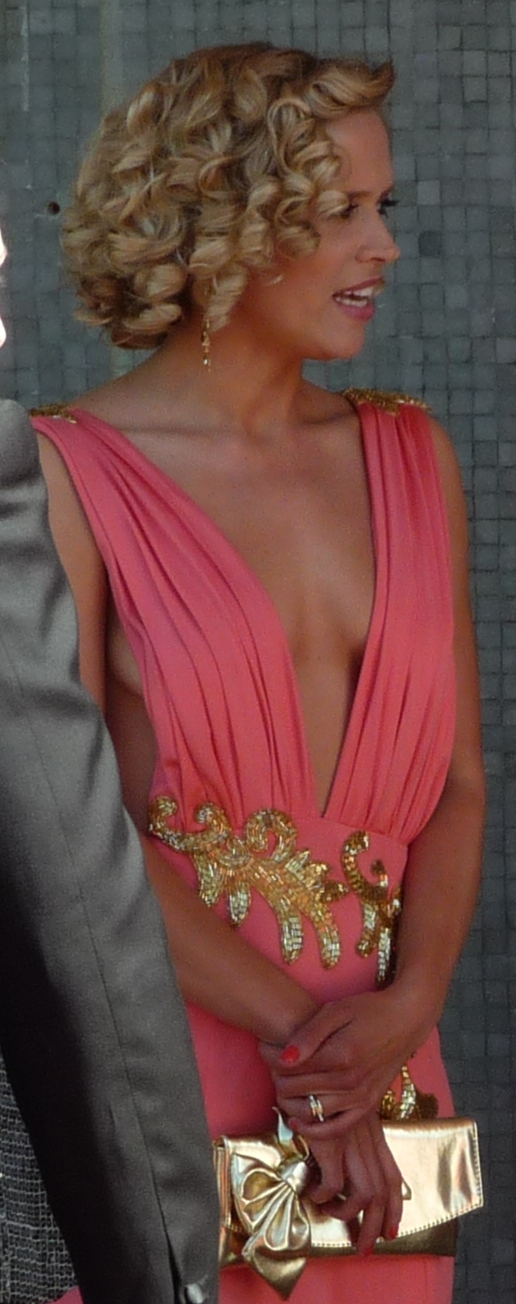
- Cordingly in 2009
- Born: Rebecca Cordingly; 25 October 1976 (age 50); Brighton, Sussex, England
- Years active: 1998–present
- Spouse: Adam Speers (m. 2011; div. 2023)
- Partner: Ian Kelsey
- Children: 1
- Father: David Cordingly
- Website: www.bethcordingly.com

Rebecca Cordingly (born 25 October 1976), known professionally as Beth Cordingly, is an English actress, known for her appearances in series The Bill, Dead Set, The Burning Girls and Emmerdale.

== Early and personal life ==
Cordingly was born on 25 October 1976 in Brighton and attended Brighton and Hove High School. She is the daughter of writer and historian David Cordingly.

Cordingly went to the University of Birmingham where she studied English and Drama. She went on to train as an actress at the Webber Douglas Academy of Dramatic Art in London.

In 2004, it was reported that she was in a relationship with Daniel MacPherson, who was also her on-screen partner in the police procedural series The Bill.

In 2009, she was living on a houseboat in east London. Since 2021, she has been in a relationship with fellow actor Ian Kelsey.

== Career ==
Cordingly made her first major television appearance in the soap opera, Family Affairs as troubled teenager Sara Warrington; a lapdancer who blew most of her wages on cocaine. She left the soap after a year to play the lead in Noël Coward's Semi-Monde at the Lyric Theatre, West End. The play was directed by Philip Prowse and produced by Thelma Holt. She then played Rose, a cabinet secretary reporting to Derek Jacobi's Major Merton, in Two Men went to War, a film starring Kenneth Cranham and Leo Bill.

In 2002, she joined The Bill as PC Kerry Young. After her departure from the show when her character was murdered in 2004, ITV made an hour-long spin off called Kerry's Story that aired on ITV3. In 2023, Cordingly shared her memories of her time on The Bill during a three-part interview for The Bill Podcast, where she was interviewed by her friend and former co-star Natalie Roles.

In 2005, she played Vienna Keen, an exotic dancer, in BBC's Funland, and in 2007, she played Naomi in Secret Diary of a Call Girl, a call girl who has a threesome together with the show's main protagonist, Hannah, played by Billie Piper.

In March and April 2017, Cordingly appeared as Debbie Morton, Shirley Carter's (Linda Henry) cellmate in British soap opera EastEnders. She has played a variety of roles on television, notably filming two series for Charlie Brooker, playing Veronica in his zombie series Dead Set and featuring in his sketch show, How TV Ruined Your Life with Kevin Eldon.

In theatre she has worked nationally and abroad. In 2006 she played the role of Nina in the Menier Chocolate Factory's production of Breakfast with Jonny Wilkinson. In 2013, it was made into an independent feature film and she reprised her role, this time opposite George MacKay, Nigel Lindsay and Norman Pace. When playing Amy in Salt at Manchester Royal Exchange she was nominated for the Manchester Evening News Award for Best Performance in a Studio Production (2010). She worked with Sharon Gless on A Round Heeled Woman in the West End (2012) and has twice played lead roles in Feydeau farces for Sam Walters at the Orange Tree Theatre. In 2012 she played Louisa in Children's Children at the Almeida Theatre, a play directed by Jeremy Herrin and written by Matthew Dunster. In 2015, Dunster directed her in Love's Sacrifice for the RSC, in the Swan Theatre, Stratford-upon-Avon. In the same RSC season she played Bellamira in The Jew of Malta, starring Jasper Britton.

On 6 December 2023, Jessica Sansome of the Manchester Evening News announced that Cordingly had joined the cast of Emmerdale as Ruby Fox-Miligan, the wife of Caleb Miligan (William Ash) and mother of Nicky Miligan (Lewis Cope). She made her first appearance in January 2024. For her role as Ruby, Cordingly was longlisted for Best Newcomer and Best Villain at the 2024 Inside Soap Awards.

== Writing ==
Cordingly has an MA in creative writing from Birkbeck, University of London. In 2009, her short story "Marianne and Ellie" was selected by Sarah Waters to be published in an anthology of short stories, Dancing with Mr Darcy. In 2012, she won the Litro magazine Double Dutch short story competition for her short story about Amsterdam, "The Bike Ride".

== Charity work ==
Cordingly is an Ambassador for ChildLine and regularly speaks on their behalf. She ran the London Marathon in 2004 for them and spoke at the 2006 Anti-bullying week conference at Westminster Central Hall. In 2009 she was given an award at the House of Commons of the United Kingdom for her outstanding contributions to the NSPCC.

== Filmography ==
Year	Title	Role	Notes
2000–2001	Family Affairs	Sara Warrington	Regular role
2001	Casualty	Liz	Episode: "Consequences"
2002	Two Men Went to War	Rose	Film
2002–2004	The Bill	Kerry Young	Main role
2005	Doctors	Mel Brindell	Episode: "Credit Limit"
2005	Funland	Vienna Keen	
2006	Heartbeat	Connie Green	Episode: "Stumped"
2007	Secret Diary of a Call Girl	Naomi	1 episode
2008	New Tricks	Anna Hodgkiss	Episode: "Couldn't Organise One"
2008	Cartwheels	Sylvia	Short film
2008	Dead Set	Veronica	Main role
2009	Trial & Retribution	Wendy Bilkin	Episode: "Shooter"
2009	Merlin	Forridel	Episode: "The Nightmare Begins"
2010	Material Girl	Lynn Jones	
2010	Casualty	Sharon Holder	Episode: "Making Other Plans"
2011	How TV Ruined Your Life	Lucy	
2013	Breakfast with Jonny Wilkinson	Nina	Film
2016	Suspects	Chrissy	2 episodes
2017	EastEnders	Debbie Morton	Recurring role
2022	Doctors	Heidi Sitwell	Episode: "A Difficult Conversation"
2023	The Burning Girls	Emma Harper	
2024–present	Emmerdale	Ruby Fox-Miligan	Regular role

== Stage ==
Year	Title	Role	Venue
1998	York Mystery Cycles	Mary Magdalen	Toronto Festival
1999	Othello	Desdemona	Orange Tree Theatre
2001	Semi-Monde	Norma	Lyric Theatre, West End
2005	Monkey's Uncle	Cecile/Christine	Orange Tree Theatre
2006	Breakfast with Jonny Wilkinson	Nina	Menier Chocolate Factory
2007	Bedroom Farce	Susannah	No.1 Tour
2009	Our Man in Havana	Milly Wormold/Beatrice Severn	Nottingham Playhouse
2010	Salt	Amy	Royal Exchange Theatre
2011	Once Bitten	Cesarine	Orange Tree Theatre
2012	A Round Heeled Woman	Nathalie	Riverside Studios/West End
2012	Sauce for the Goose	Lucienne	Orange Tree Theatre
2012	Children's Children	Louisa	Almeida Theatre
2015	The Jew of Malta	Bellamira	RSC, Swan Theatre, Stratford-upon-Avon
2015	Love's Sacrifice	Fiormonda	RSC, Swan Theatre, Stratford-upon-Avon
2018	Sideways	Terra	St James's Theatre, London
2019	The Merry Wives of Windsor	Mistress Ford	RSC, The Barbican
2019	Romeo and Juliet	Prince Escalus	Stratford-upon-Avon/The Barbican
2019	The Memory of Water	Mary	Nottingham Playhouse/Guildford
2019–2020	The Canterville Ghost	Mrs Otis	Unicorn Theatre, London

== Awards and nominations ==
Year	Ceremony	Category	Work	Result	Ref.
2024	RadioTimes.com Soap Awards	Best Newcomer	Emmerdale	Nominated	
2024	RadioTimes.com Soap Awards	Best Villain	Emmerdale	Nominated	
2025	2025 British Soap Awards	Best Leading Performer	Emmerdale	Nominated	
2025	2025 British Soap Awards	Best On Screen Partnership (with William Ash)	Emmerdale	Nominated	
