= Royce Cronin =

British actor

- Born: Bournemouth, UK
- Occupation: Actor
- Years active: 1995–present

Royce Cronin is an English actor and musician from Bournemouth, known for his roles in television series and theatre work. Beginning in the 1990s, Cronin has pursued his stage career and in the early 2000s gained roles as Luke Warrington in the British soap opera Family Affairs and later played Chris Silverstone in the series 24seven. Cronin continued to appear in guest roles in film and television but concentrated on theatre roles during his later career.

== Career ==
Cronin is from Bournemouth, UK and began his stage career there. He attended Lytchett Minster School in Bourenmouth. He later studied further professional acting training at the Oxford School of Drama on a three-year course. His early amateur stage roles occurred during this time. In October 1994, Cronin appeared the schools production of Blood Wedding and in January 1995, he performed in another stage musical aged 18. In October 1996, Cronin appeared in Mr Ken Dee's musical variety theatre show in Bournemouth. In October 1996, he appeared in a production of A Coat of Varnish at Bournemouth Pier theatre. In May 1997, Cronin played Ralph in John Godber's Bouncers at Bournemouth Pier theatre when he was a member of the Castle Players theatre group. He continued his stage career in September 1998, appearing in the male titular role in Romeo and Juliet at the Bournemouth Centre. He then joined a band with his cousin, called Easy Tiger and Cronin described them as an indie band.

In the early 2000s, Cronin appeared as Luke Warrington in the soap opera Family Affairs. Discussing the role Cronin stated "Luke is far more technical and scientific, whereas I am more artistic. Luke is also more of a romantic figure than I am." At the same time, he played Chris Silverstone in the children's series 24seven, which aired in both the UK and US and had two seasons. In 2008, Cronin played Victor in C Company production, The Fetch at the Old Red Lion Theatre. Cronin went onto appear in the BBC film D-Day 6.6.1944 in 2004 and the ITV's The Marchioness Disaster in 2007.

Cronin later became a volunteer for the Omnibus theatre group and helped them renovate a disused library in Clapham. The premises became the groups theatre and Cronin was a "live-in guardian" at the library. Once completed, Cronin took the role of Andres in the group's opening production of Woyzeck in November 2013.

In September 2018, Cronin appeared as King Rhydian the rat in a Dick Whittington pantomime at Theatr Clwyd, Wales. He appeared in the 2018 film Bohemian Rhapsody. In 2019, Cronin appeared in an Omnibus theatre production titled The Little Prince, playing the role of The Rose. The show received the 2020 Offie for "Best Production for Ages 3-8".

He played then played Michel van Rijn in The Iconoclast. In 2021, Cronin appeared as Derek Kennedy in the British soap opera Doctors, in the episode titled "Knocking Dollies". He played Capa Team Leader in the 2023 film Gran Turismo and Ross in The Band Back Together by Barney Norris on tour and at the Arcola Theatre London.

Cronin is a member of the Pint Sized team at The Bunker Theatre, in his role he writes and performs music.

== Filmography ==
Year	Title	Role	Notes
2000–2002	Family Affairs	Luke Warrington	Regular role
2001–2002	24seven	Chris Silverstone	Regular role
2003	Casualty	Chris	Guest role
2004	D-Day 6.6.1944	Albert Fraley	Film role
2007	The Marchioness Disaster	John James	Film role
2009	Shifts	Chris Smith	Short film
2013	Boom	Bosh	Film role
2014	First Light	Peter	Film role
2016	Salmon		Short film
2018	Bohemian Rhapsody	TV Director	Film role
2021	Doctors	Derek Kennedy	Guest role
2023	Gran Turismo	Capa Team Leader	Film role
