= Soaplife =

British magazine

- Editor: Paul Brooks
- Former editors: Hellen Gardner
- Categories: Soap opera
- Frequency: Monthly (1999−2004); Fortnightly (2004−2018); Weekly (2018)
- Circulation: 42,200 (ABC Jul – Dec 2017)
- First issue: June 1999
- Final issue: August 2018
- Company: TI Media
- Country: United Kingdom
- Language: English

Soaplife was a soap opera magazine published in the United Kingdom by TI Media (formerly IPC Media and Time Inc. UK). The magazine was first published in 1999 and focused on British and Australian soap operas. It was originally published monthly, before changing its frequency to fortnightly in 2004 when it underwent a relaunch. The relaunch focuses on an emphasis on photography and features more television shows. Staff worked on the redesign over six months. Soaplife's publishing frequency was increased to weekly in 2018 following an increased demand for the magazine. On 26 July 2018, it was announced that the magazine would cease production after failing to sell enough copies.

== History ==
Soaplife was first published in 1999 and features news about British and Australian soap operas and their cast. The magazine was originally published monthly, before becoming published fortnightly in 2004 when it went under a relaunch. As part of the relaunch, Soaplife received a £500,000 investment from owners, IPC Media. The relaunch sees several new features included in the magazine, including a bigger emphasis on photography. The decision to relaunch the magazine was made due to the "growing" industry of soap operas. On the decision to focus on photography, editor Hellen Gardner said, "We feel it's a very modern way of doing it. We want to major as much as we can on pictures – they are just as important as words." The expansion to fortnightly publishing allowed the magazine to feature more television shows, although Gardner reassured readers that the magazine would not become a "general TV listings magazine". Staff at Soaplife had been working on the publication's redesign for six months. The first magazine released under the redesign was priced at half of its regular price (60p), although it continued to be sold at its regular price afterwards.

The magazine is branded as the publication that is "written by soap lovers for soap lovers". In February 2018, Soaplife increased its publishing frequency from fortnightly to weekly after "popular demand" for the magazine. Shortly afterwards, it was revealed that the magazine was one of two TV, film and music magazines with an increase growth in sales between July and December 2017. It was announced on 26 July 2018 that Soaplife would cease production in August 2018, six months after increasing its publishing frequency, as the sales of the magazine were "not sufficient to make the title viable". The final edition of the magazine was published on 7 August. Angie O'Farrell, the group managing director for TI Media's weekly and lifestyle magazines, said that the company would close Soaplife and focus on its other television magazines.
