= Chloe Harris =

Fictional character from Emmerdale

- Emmerdale character
- Portrayed by: Jessie Elland
- Duration: 2021–2023
- First appearance: Episode 9132; 20 August 2021
- Last appearance: Episode 9871; 26 December 2023
- Introduced by: Jane Hudson
In-universe information
- Father: Tony
- Mother: Kerry Wyatt
- Adoptive father: Damon "Harry" Harris
- Adoptive mother: Karen Harris
- Sisters: Amy Wyatt; Gemma Harris (adoptive)
- Sons: Reuben Harris
- Nephews: Kyle Dingle

Chloe Harris is a fictional character from the ITV soap opera Emmerdale, played by Jessie Elland. She made her first appearance on 20 August 2021. Chloe was introduced as the sister of Gemma Harris, a dead teenager whose heart was given to Sarah Sugden (Katie Hill) in a transplant. Elland was attracted to the role as she felt that Chloe is a well-written character and she felt a responsibility to do the role justice when she was cast. Chloe is characterised as a sweet and genuine person who is secretly struggling with feelings of sadness, anger, and frustration. This is initially explained through her grief for her dead sister, but later into her tenure, it is revealed that she has a controlling father who is in prison. Chloe's family home is installed with several cameras and her father hires numerous people to watch over her. Eventually, Kerry Wyatt (Laura Norton), her housekeeper and secret biological mother, helps her to escape and invites her to live with Kerry in the Emmerdale village.

When Chloe moves into the village, she forms a relationship with Noah Dingle (Jack Downham). She eventually loses interest in him and has casual relationships with Jacob Gallagher (Joe-Warren Plant) and Nate Robinson (Jurell Carter). This led to a stalking storyline for Chloe when Noah forms an unhealthy and sexist obsession with her. Elland praised Emmerdale for covering a storyline about misogyny and sexism, a topic she described as "such a relevant conversation". She also felt privileged to be given a topical and issue-led storyline. Later storylines have seen Chloe discover that Kerry is her mother and having a baby with Mackenzie Boyd (Lawrence Robb) behind his wife's back. Chloe's final storyline, the introduction of adoptive father Damon (Robert Beck), accommodated Elland's decision to leave Emmerdale after two years. Her final scenes aired on 26 December 2023.

== Casting and characterisation ==
Jessie Elland was cast as Chloe in May 2021 and it was announced by ITV on 20 August 2021, the day her first scenes were transmitted. The initial audition for the role was a self-tape video, and a week after submitting it, Elland was invited into the Emmerdale studios for a screen test. She joked that the studios reminded her of an IKEA shop due to the sets being next to each other in a "maze of rooms"; she was also "in awe at the attention to detail in each set". She was nervous for the screen test since it was her first in-person audition in her career, but considered herself lucky to be doing a scene with Karen Blick. One week later, Elland received a phone call from her agent to inform her that she had secured the role. A week after being cast, Elland began filming, an experience she described as a "whirlwind" due to the fast-paced nature of the soap. She looked forward to her costume fitting and was pleasantly surprised by the costuming the team had devised for Chloe. She was also grateful to the team for allowing her to keep her natural red hair colour for the character, since she did not feel that darker hair would suit her.

It was confirmed that Chloe's entrance would be linked to Sarah Sugden (Katie Hill) and she was introduced as the sister of Gemma Harris, a dead teenager whose heart was given to Sarah in a heart transplant three years prior to Chloe's introduction. When she received information on the character, Elland thought that Chloe was well-written and felt a responsibility to put lots of work into the role and "do the part justice". Chloe is characterised as "very sweet and genuine, eager to please and make connections with people, but underneath it all she is struggling with a lot of sadness, anger, and frustration." Elland explained that the darker side of Chloe has come from experiences throughout her life that have made her old beyond her years, which she felt had given Chloe determination to go out and get what she wants. She also said how Chloe is not afraid to speak her mind and that she is used to getting what she wants. Elland initially found it difficult to relate to her character since she found her to be "naïve, vulnerable, and super sweet". However, as she got further into her tenure, she discovered similarities to Chloe, with one example being that they both value sisterhood. She also resonated with Chloe's determined streak.

== Development ==
=== Meeting Sarah Sugden and troubled family life ===
Prior to her arrival, Leeds Live wrote that Chloe's storyline with Sarah would form a major storyline on the soap. Chloe's reason for looking for Sarah comes from a place of desperation since she feels desperate to talk about Gemma and the memories she has of her, since that opportunity had been denied by her family. Elland said that another reason was due to wanting a good thing to come from something as tragic as losing her sister. When the pair first meet, Chloe has "a lot of expectations, worries, and questions" and places a lot of pressure on both herself and Sarah. The meeting is unsuccessful when both of the characters get overwhelmed and due to the failure, Chloe experiences "an even bigger mix of emotions" but feels grounded when she eventually forms a friendship with Sarah. Elland confirmed that despite their initial friendship, there would be "a rocky road ahead" in the pair's storyline.

When she meets with Sarah, Chloe receives numerous phone calls which she averts and then suddenly declares that she has to leave. Viewers predicted that these hints had formed the start of a "sinister storyline" for the character. In scenes aired in September 2021, Chloe opens up to Sarah and Noah Dingle (Jack Downham) about her troubled family life. She admits that she is lonely without her sister and that her father is not present in her life. She eventually "crumbles into tears". Sarah becomes puzzled about Chloe's home life when she makes a habit of gifting Sarah expensive jewellery. After much speculation from viewers about Chloe's intentions with Sarah, her home life was explored on-screen in November 2021. Laura Norton, who plays Chloe's housekeeper Kerry Wyatt, revealed that Chloe is "mistreated and controlled" by her father Damon, who is in prison, as well as by the men who he employs.

Norton said in the off-screen time that the characters have spent together, Kerry has become protective over Chloe. Kerry knows that Damon is a dangerous man and is scared of him, but is trusted with responsibilities aside from cleaning that include interacting with Chloe, which led to their bond. Norton added although Damon is in prison, he is aware of everything that happens in the house. She explained: "He's got men working for him that watch every move she makes, and his daughter makes. CCTV in every room in the house, they're being watched, they're being followed. Everything they spend, everywhere they go, every conversation they have. They have to be incredibly careful." Chloe eventually escapes and moves in with Kerry. Chloe and Amy Wyatt (Natalie Ann Jamieson) are "on guard with each other at first" but they eventually form a sisterly bond, which Elland said was an interesting dynamic to explore. Elland found it interesting that Damon, an off-screen character, had had such an influence on Chloe's personality, but hinted that he could eventually appear on the soap after he leaves prison. The actress was enthusiastic about the potential of introducing Damon and opined that a lot could happen for Chloe if the "gangster" arrived. When asked what she pictures when she thinks of Damon, Elland said that she imagines him to be a "stereotypical Northern man with a big ginger beard" and named Sean Bean as an example.

=== Relationship with Noah Dingle and stalking ordeal ===
Upon her casting, Metro's Duncan Lindsay confirmed that Chloe would form a friendship with Noah. Eventually, Noah forms romantic feelings for Chloe, which disgusts Sarah since she feels that he will ruin her friendship with Chloe. He begins telling people that she is his girlfriend, which Chloe is shocked to learn. However, after meeting him in secret a few times, Chloe forms romantic feelings for Noah, which their families are not pleased about. Kerry and Noah's mother Charity (Emma Atkins) ban the pair from seeing each other, due to feeling that their relationship would bring trouble for both families. Elland compared the couple's situation to Romeo and Juliet and noted that they see each other as a "way to be happy and free". In a bid to be together, they plan an escape from the village, and Chloe begins to see Noah as an "escape route" from her controlling father. She confirmed that although her character does like Noah, but her main reason for executing the plan is to escape her home. However, they are soon found and took back home. Elland said that the runaway scenes were fun to film since she enjoyed working with Downham on location and the weather was nice at the time.

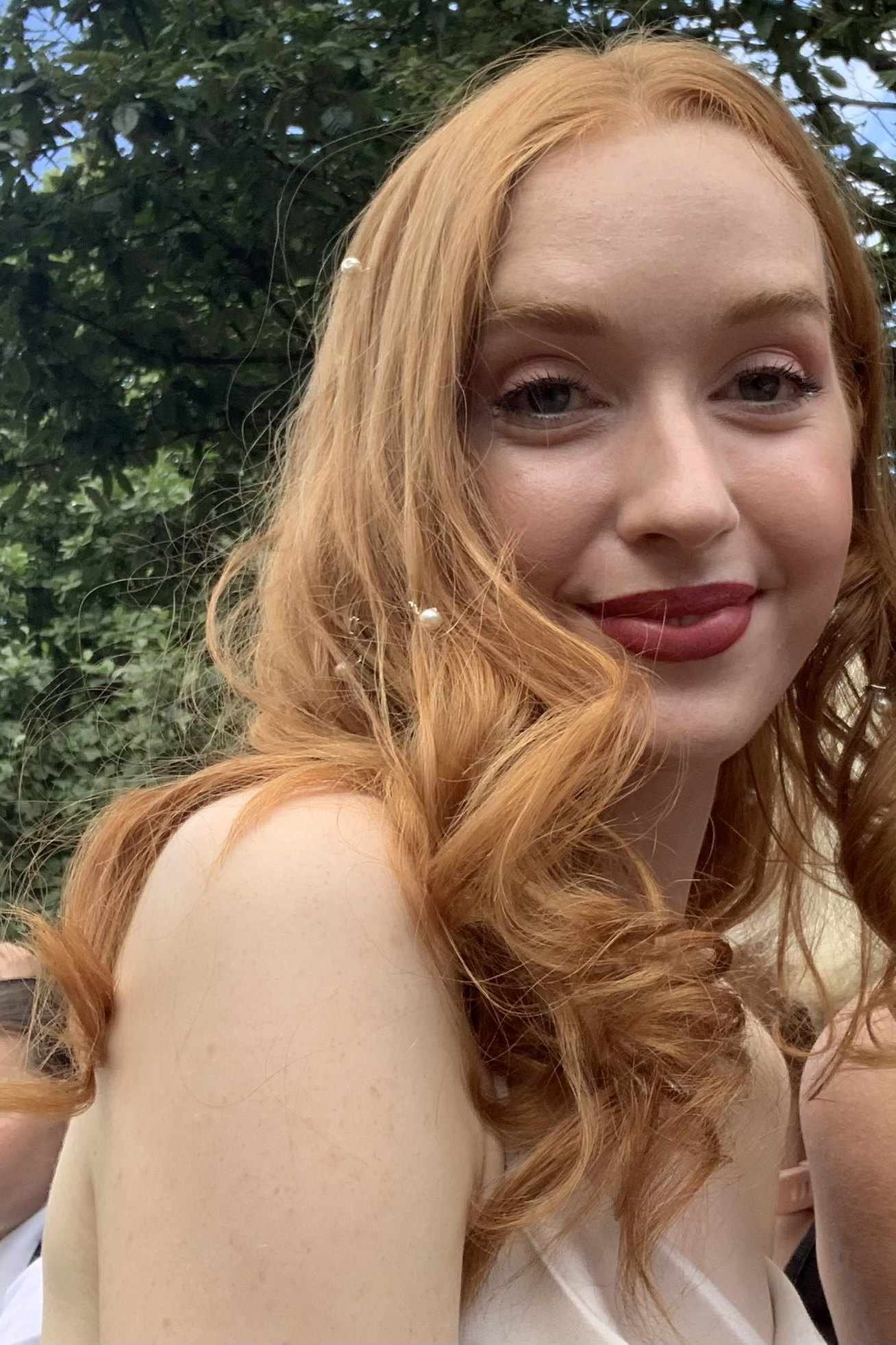
Elland appreciated Emmerdale for covering a plot about misogyny, a topic she found to be a relevant conversation.

After Chloe loses interest in Noah, she has sex with Jacob Gallagher (Joe-Warren Plant). She is hurt when he claims that it was "just sex" to him, and after Noah learns of it, he loses his temper and brands her a "dirty slapper". He attempts to apologise to Chloe and brings her flowers, but she affirms that he is toxic and his wording was unacceptable. He snaps once again, throwing the flowers across the room and calling her a "village bike". The Metro's Calli Kitson worried for Chloe if Noah were to show more of his "sexism and toxic attitude". Lindsay (Metro) later confirmed that the story regarding Noah and Chloe was heading in a dark direction and said that he is capable of evil to pursue Chloe, despite her not wanting a relationship. Chloe spends the night with Nate Robinson (Jurell Carter), which Noah discovers. In an attempt to get Chloe back on his good side, he offers to take her for a drink to which she declines. Noah is "left angered by the apparent lack of reward for his apology" and is angered further when he learns of Chloe's fling with Nate.

Speaking on the storyline, Elland said that Chloe had set her sights on Nate, who rejects her. Chloe then has to "deal with not getting her own way" and Noah takes advantage of Chloe's vulnerable state by getting close to her. His sudden change of attitude leads her to think Noah has "turned over a new leaf" and makes her keen to patch up her bond with him. However, Chloe sees her connection to Noah as a friendship. Elland explained that Chloe is engrossed in her feelings for Nate which means she cannot see that Noah's dishonest apologies and bad attitude. Chloe enjoys having somebody to confide in, but Elland confirmed that the storyline would eventually take a twist. She praised Emmerdale for covering a storyline about misogyny and sexism, a topic she described as "such a relevant conversation, especially in this day and age". She also felt privileged to be given an important topical storyline. Noah buys Chloe concert tickets, but uninterested in going with him, she leaves him for Nate. This leaves Noah "feeling vengeful" and a "dark choice" leads him to steal her phone. He plants a tracker on her phone so that he can show up in the same places as her, which he claims are coincidences. He pretends to have found her missing phone, and with Chloe thankful for him, he uses Chloe's gratitude to his advantage by getting her to agree to a date. Later, he buys a drone and flies it outside her bedroom window, recording her. Noah then steals her keys, lets himself into her bedroom and snoops around, taking photographs of her belongings, including her underwear drawer. However, she comes home unexpectedly, and he hides in her wardrobe.

In early May 2022, Chloe was featured as "the storyline of the week" when Noah takes her hostage. Chloe is horrified to find thousands of photographs of herself and her belongings on her laptop which prove that he has been stalking her for weeks. She confronts him on the photographs, and Noah reacts badly, by refusing to let her leave and holding her mouth as she tries to scream for help. Downham, who portrays Noah, said that in his research for the storyline, he learned that many stalkers do not realise what they are doing is wrong. He found that Noah is the same, as he believes he is just trying to get Chloe's attention. On the impact Noah's stalking has on Chloe, Elland said that she is not only disgusted by his behaviour, but also reminded of how her father treated her. It affects Chloe especially since Noah knew how she had been treated by Damon, a piece of information that Elland found crucial to use when portraying how shaken Chloe is. On his comeuppance, Chloe feels conflicted. This is due to her wanting him to face justice for his cruel actions, but since he was someone that "she really liked and had a relationship with", her feelings almost hold her back. She also feels scared of the Dingle family's support for him. Elland found the character's response interesting from an acting perspective since Chloe is a strong character who wants to "put on a brave face" and appear okay, but inside, there is a lot going on. Despite his constant belief that he has done nothing wrong to Chloe, he pleads guilty in court and is sentenced to three months in prison.

=== True heritage and becoming a mother ===
In 2022, Chloe has sex with Mackenzie Boyd (Lawrence Robb) and falls pregnant. Mackenzie, who had just suffered a miscarriage with his girlfriend Charity, believed that their relationship was over at the time of having sex with Chloe. Chloe tells Kerry about the baby and her plans to leave to stop Mackenzie from discovering her pregnancy, which led to a twist over Chloe's heritage. Kerry becomes desperate for Chloe not to leave and confesses that she is Chloe's biological mother who had her adopted. She explains that she got a job as Chloe's housekeeper to see how she was. The twist left Emmerdale viewers "reeling". Mackenzie reconciles with Charity and after Chloe informs him of the baby, he tells Chloe that he wants no involvement with their child. Sarah invites Mackenzie and Charity along to a scan without asking Chloe, naively wanting to support her friend. When Mackenzie sees how much Chloe is struggling, he vows to support her in secret. However, Charity and Sarah demand that Chloe comes to stay with them all, which the Daily Mirror confirmed had formed the next twist for the storyline.

Elland admitted that she loved wearing the baby bump prosthetic while filming for the pregnancy storyline. Due to filming it through a cold winter, it helped to keep her warm and she got used to the feel of the prosthetic quickly. She took the prosthetic on Lorraine where she said: "aesthetically, I was glad to have it gone. I was looking more and more like the Grinch." In the interview, she spoke about how close she had become with Robb and Atkins through the storyline. She also hinted that when the baby's parentage is discovered, the Dingles may all come after her. Chloe gave birth to son Reuben on 20 April 2023.

=== Relationship with Mack, introduction of Damon and exit ===
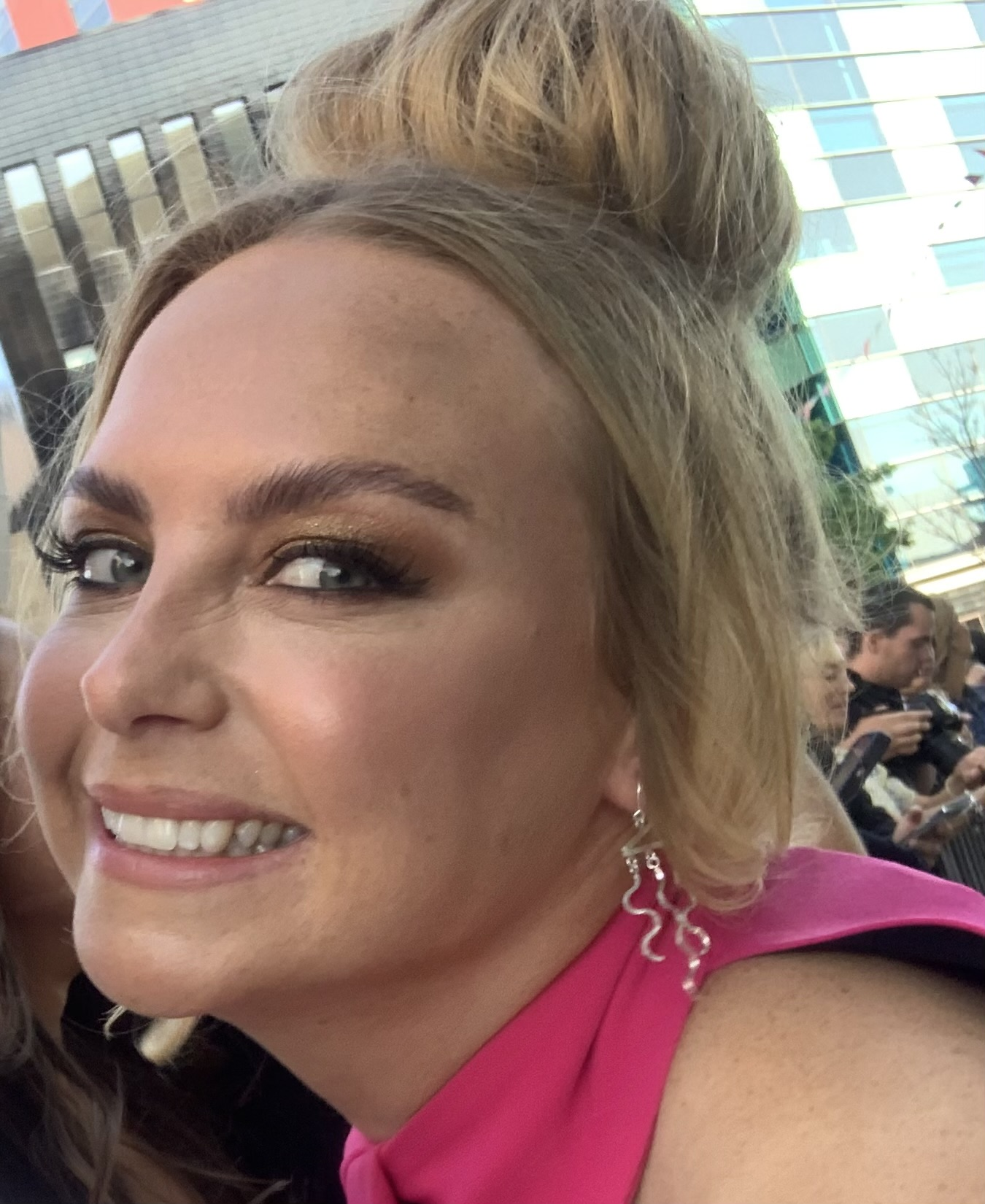
Amy (Natalie Ann Jamieson, pictured) warns Chloe not to date Mackenzie.

Despite initially wanting to raise Reuben alone, Elland said that her character would soon change her mind. Becoming a mother brings out a different side to Chloe and she soon yearns to have a family unit with Mackenzie. Amy advises her not to go for it since she knows how Charity and the rest of the Dingles would react. Elland liked the scenes since it showed that the pair's bond had "really developed, and the way they talk about it is really sisterly, which is nice". Despite Amy's advice, Chloe's "streak of stubbornness" leads her to fight for what she feels is right for both her and Reuben. Chloe partially gets what she wants after Mackenzie steps up due to Reuben having bacterial meningitis. Charity learns that Mackenzie is the father of the baby and she angrily confronts the pair. Chloe makes a move by trying to kiss him, but he rejects her advances. Weeks later, she is "delighted" when he decides to commit to her and Reuben.

The pair begin a relationship but it was confirmed that a twist would air in October 2023, as part of Emmerdale's annual "super soap week". Executive producer Jane Hudson confirmed that the plot between Chloe, Mackenzie and Charity would "explode". Mackenzie eventually cheats on Chloe by having sex with Charity, but pretends that he is still dedicated to her and Reuben. In August 2023, Emmerdale cast members were seen filming a car crash on a cliff for the super soap week. A red-haired mannequin was seen in a car that plunged over the side of the cliff, alluding to Chloe's death. Robb and Atkins were also photographed screaming at the top of the cliff, covered in blood. However, Chloe survives the crash, despite Mack opting to save Charity over her. After Mack gets back with Charity, it was hinted by Emmerdale producers that a high-profile Christmas 2023 storyline would see Chloe get in contact with Damon (Robert Beck), her adoptive father, to get the "ultimate revenge" on him.

Damon's scenes with Chloe see him promise that she can have anything she wants, including revenge on Mack, and he kidnaps Mack, leaving him tied-up in a lockup. Charity saves Mack and accidentally shoots Damon, killing him. Chloe uses his death as leverage over the couple, threatening to report them to the police if they do not let her leave with Reuben. On 26 December 2023, in previously unannounced scenes, Elland made her final appearance as Chloe, leaving the village in a taxi. Of her time on Emmerdale, she said:

I really got to tick off the soap bingo card – giving birth, discovering new family members, a big stunt, a soapy slap, and even a classic back of the taxi exit! All while working with, and learning from, incredibly talented people that I'd grown up watching on screen. [...] Meeting fans of the show and hearing how much it means to them is such a special experience and never fails to make me feel so proud and lucky to be even a small part of something so loved. I can't say thank you enough for that. It's really difficult to articulate how much Emmerdale means to me and it was by no means an easy decision to leave such a wonderful place and such wonderful people.

== Reception ==
Elland was shocked to have been recognised after only one of her episodes had been transmitted. She was out with a friend in Leeds and was pleasantly surprised to be approached by a viewer of the show who said they were a fan of hers and wanted a photo with her. Elland found that viewers did not initially trust Chloe and were protective of her intentions with Sarah. However, once she had been developed beyond the storyline with Sarah, she found that people were "starting to warm to her". Her relationship with Mackenzie was not well-received by Entertainment Daily, who billed them as a "gruesome twosome". They noted that fans were not enamoured by the storyline due to the pair being miserable and looked forward to the relationship ending. The Daily Mirror described Chloe's pictured car crash scenes as "dramatic and heartbreaking".

== See also ==
- List of Emmerdale characters (2021)
