= Hellraiser: Origins =

Cancelled British film

- Directed by: Mike Le Han
- Produced by: Paul Gerrard; Mike Le Han
- Cinematography: Robert Shacklady
- Edited by: Andy Sharrat; Trevor Storey; Ciarán Wright
- Music by: Lorne Balfe
- Production company: GerrardArt
- Countries: United Kingdom; United States
- Language: English

Hellraiser: Origins was a cancelled independent film project based on Clive Barker's Hellraiser films, and was presented as a two-minute long pitch trailer directed by Mike Le Han (The Great Train Robbery, Mrs Peppercorn's Magical Reading Room). Written and produced by Paul Gerrard (Battle Los Angeles, Wrath of the Titans), the trailer was intended to be a reboot of Hellraiser, but due to multiple factors, it did not progress to filming as a feature film.

== Trailer ==
The trailer was released on an independent website and on YouTube on 31 October 2013. Approximately two minutes (2:07) minutes long, it opens with ominous music and text fading in and out of the center frame:

Before there was man...

Before any life...

There was...

HELL

It then cuts to a top down view of a thin, disheveled man kneeling in a square of salt and lit candles, solving what fans of the franchise would recognize as the Lament Configuration from the original Hellraiser films. The top of the box opens and the man lets out a howl of agony, the camera rapidly zooming down and into the open box. It follows a twisting, convoluted tunnel of flesh, similar to a human intestine. The camera reaches the end of the tunnel where the view is entirely obscured by a bright light.

The shot fades in to reveal an apparent sea of writhing, naked human bodies covered in blood, with body parts and viscera scattered throughout. The camera continues to pan over the sea of bodies until reaching a platform, rising and gradually revealing a stylized version of Hellraiser's Pinhead. The shot zooms slowly in to an extreme close up as Pinhead opens his eyes and music fades in. In a deep, inhuman voice he says "Welcome to Hell".

The scene then cuts to a wider shot of Hell, showing Pinhead standing on a platform, surrounded by an even larger sea of bodies. The shot flickers in and out, each time zooming further out and finally fading to Hellraiser: Origins and showing the web address for the project's page.

== Production ==
The Hellraiser: Origins production process took over two and a half years from concept art to its premiere. This left some speculating that a reboot of Hellraiser was stuck in development hell.

=== Inspiration ===
The concept for Hellraiser: Origins came from concept artist Paul Gerrard noticing a decline in quality of the Hellraiser films since the 1980s, and deciding that a reboot was necessary. He also wished to expand upon the existing mythology from the Epic and BOOM! Hellraiser comic books.

"Our goal was to expand and explore the mythology, to create an epic vibe while retaining the mystery of the Cenobite order. It's about keeping that balance between the mystery of the unknown, and need to see more, to experience more. The original movie was indeed a masterpiece of imagination and iconic horror. The world we live in so saturated with the tones and taboos explored in those early movies that in order to truly capture the imagination of today's audience a new direction was needed. I wanted the design, particularly of Pinhead to firstly be stripped of the current restraints and second to be driven by esoteric lines, shapes, and concepts."

— Paul Gerrard, Interview with Horror Homework, 2 November 2013.

=== Pre-production ===
Throughout the production of Hellraiser: Origins, the majority of publicity for the project was conducted on social media platforms - in particular Facebook. This allowed the recruitment of 47 (mostly unpaid) crew members and over a hundred extras, many were fans, and who claimed to share Gerrard's vision.

Pre-production concept art was developed by Paul Gerrard and displayed on his website long before the announcement of plans for Hellraiser: Origins, although his Pinhead design was kept secret prior to filming.

=== Filming ===
Principal photography took place in a single day in August 2012 at Green Screen set at Black Island Studios in North Acton, London. The 'Sea of Bodies' involved over a hundred unpaid extras, with makeup and effects by Rogue Creation FX.

It was shot with an Arri Alexa 4:3 Camera and anamorphic lenses. All extras were made to sign a nondisclosure agreement.

== Reception ==
The video on Mike Lè Han's personal YouTube account gained 80,000 views in the week following its publishing.

The release of Hellraiser: Origins gained significant attention from the online horror community, including popular horror site Bloody Disgusting, with the page owner Brad Miska praising the pre-release concept art yet reminding fans that Hellraiser: Origins was not an official production and may not be received by Dimension Films. Jeffrey Lamar from mitng.org also praised the artwork, noting the amount of fan input and dedication that went into the project,

"Strange how a movie, so sinister, can be created with such love. I'd certainly hate to see this man's hard work or the work of the crew behind this trailer, go unnoticed."

— Jeffery Lamar, mitng.org, 6 November 2013.

Gerrard's Pinhead design attracted a level of controversy. While some fans welcoming the new, more rustic design along with the reboot, others voiced discontent over the new Pinhead style. In particular the absence of Doug Bradley was a chief complaint.

== Clive Barker's announcement ==
Just six days prior to the Halloween release of Hellraiser: Origins, Clive Barker, director of the original film and creator, announced on his page that he was working with Dimension Films to produce his own Hellraiser reboot, featuring Doug Bradley. The Hellraiser: Origins concept and its trailer was not mentioned, and as of March 2015, Barker has not acknowledged it.

On 10 April 2014, Gerrard posted an announcement of his own:

"I am sad to have to announce that it is very unlikely now that HRO will get made. The world and the current film market just wasn't ready for such an elaborate take on the HR universe. We aimed so very high in every single aspect of this feature but alas perhaps we aimed too high. HRO would have shocked, elated, thrilled and amazed its audience, I fully believe that but alas the studios and press did not get behind us. So to hell with them. Only the fans got behind us and I thank you all. The creative HUB created from this epic process will never be tamed, we will be back one way or another. With a vengeance! I thank you all for your support and dedication. I have been taken to the heights of elation producing, creating this beast, crushed with disappointment at its failure to find its ground. It took me a long while to get back to normal, whatever normal is but expect dark hell to surface from me again. It has to, you can't hold that back.

Warm regards,

Paul Gerrard"

— Paul Gerrard, Hellraiser: Origins Facebook Page, 10 April 2014.
