= Jessie Elland =

English actress (born 2000)

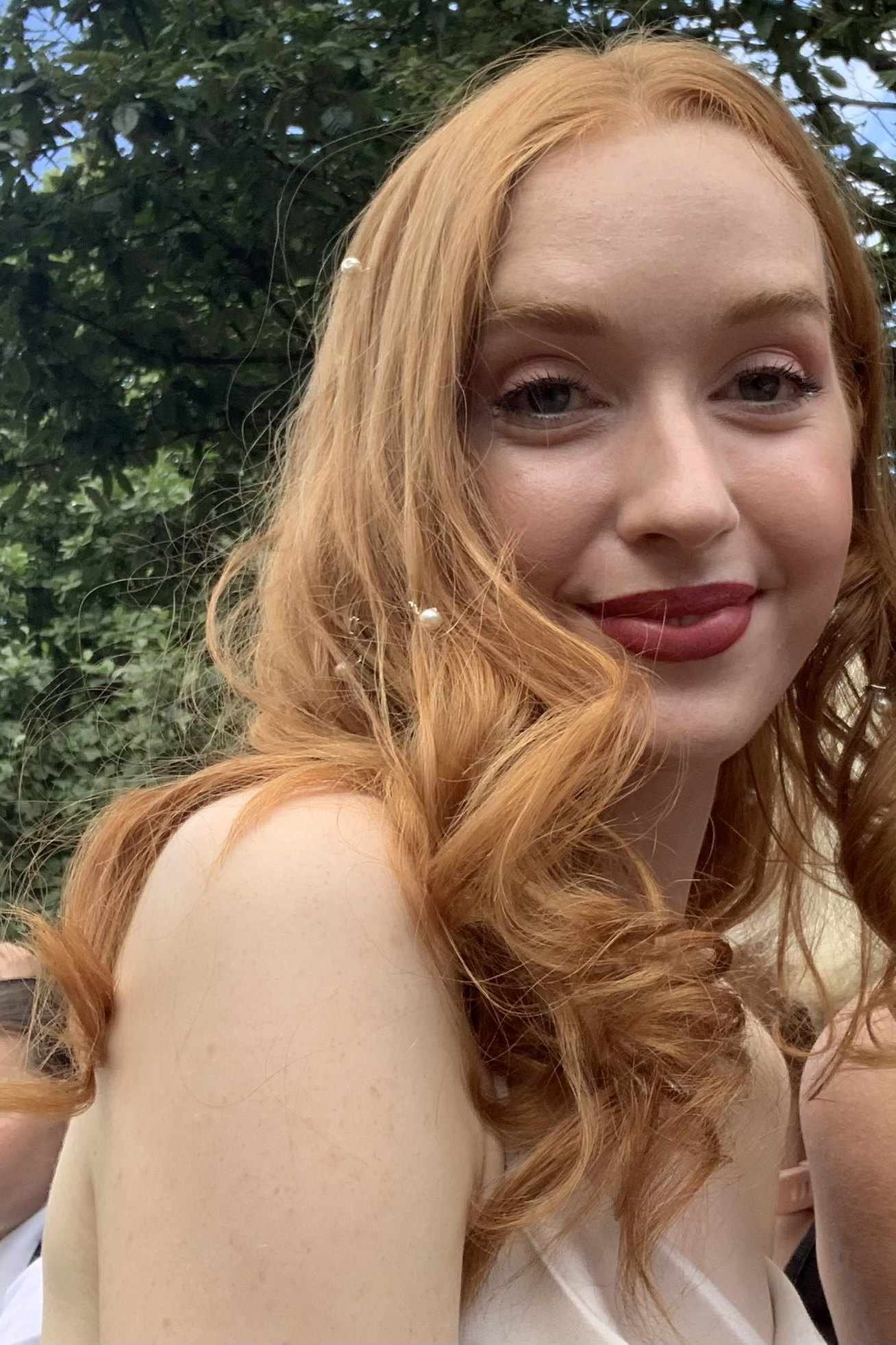
- Elland in 2022
- Born: 2000 (age 25–26); Darlington, County Durham, England
- Occupations: Actress; author
- Writing career
- Years active: 2021–present
- Genres: Horror fiction; historical
- Website: www.jessieelland.co.uk

Jessie Elland (born 2000) is an English actress and author. She portrayed the role of Chloe Harris in the ITV1 soap opera Emmerdale from 2021 to 2023. Elland has also released a novel, The Ladie Upstairs, in May 2025, as well as appeared in stage productions including 101 Dalmatians and Little Shop of Horrors.

== Life and career ==
Elland was born in 2000 in Darlington, County Durham. Elland has stated that going to drama school was not an option for her, so she initially studied anthropology at the University of Manchester, as well as auditing a drama course. However, after a week, she switched to a full-time drama course, as well as doing extracurricular drama. After doing modelling work, Elland made her television debut in two episodes of the Sky One drama series COBRA.

In 2021, Elland was cast in the ITV1 soap opera Emmerdale as Chloe Harris. It was confirmed that her character would be linked to Sarah Sugden (Katie Hill) and she was introduced as the sister of Gemma Harris, a dead teenager whose heart was given to Sarah in a heart transplant three years prior to Chloe's introduction. She stayed on the series until 2023; her storylines during her tenure included escaping from her controlling father, being stalked by Noah Dingle (Jack Downham), discovering her mother is Kerry Wyatt (Laura Norton), having a baby with Mackenzie Boyd (Lawrence Robb), falling from a cliff and blackmailing Mackenzie into sole custody of her child.

Following her exit from Emmerdale, Elland toured in a production of 101 Dalmatians in 2024. Also in 2024, she announced that she had a written a novel, The Ladie Upstairs. She explained that since the age of six, she had wanted to be both an author and an actress and was overjoyed to have achieved both of her goals. The book, published in May 2025 by Baskerville, is a historical horror fiction piece. In 2026, it was announced that she would portray Audrey in Little Shop of Horrors at the Liverpool Playhouse. She will appear in the production from December 2026 to January 2027.

== Filmography ==
Year	Title	Role	Notes
2021	COBRA	Technician	Recurring role
2021–2023	Emmerdale	Chloe Harris	Regular role
2024	Drama Queens	Herself	2 episodes

== Stage ==
Year	Title	Role	Venue
2024	101 Dalmatians	Danielle	UK tour
2026–2027	Little Shop of Horrors	Audrey	Liverpool Playhouse

== Bibliography ==
- The Ladie Upstairs. Hachette UK. 22 May 2025. ISBN 978-1-3998-1779-0.
