= Paul Gerrard (artist) =

British concept artist

Paul Gerrard is a British concept designer best known for his designs of characters and monsters for films such as Wrath of the Titans, Battle Los Angeles and Teenage Mutant Ninja Turtles.

Specializing in computer-generated imagery (CGI), Gerrard's common themes include fusion of organic tissue with machines and plant life.

Gerrard is based in the North East of England and is active in the CGI community, having worked as a concept artist for the 2015 film Seventh Son and the 2016-17 television series The Shannara Chronicles.

== Hellraiser: Origins ==
An avid fan of the Hellraiser horror films, Gerrard worked alongside Director Mike Le Han to develop a 'pitch trailer' Hellraiser: Origins in an attempt to reboot the series. Released on Halloween 2013, the two-minute long picture was filmed at Black Island Studios in North Acton, London, featuring a cast of over a hundred extras and utilizing green screen effects provided by Shade VFX (USA), Delicate Machines (Canada) and Fugitive Studios (UK).

Despite gaining the approval of thousands of Hellraiser fans on Social Media, Hellraiser: Origins did not progress to a feature presentation, with the franchise creator Clive Barker announcing his intent to produce his own reboot along with Dimension Pictures.

== Company of Shadows ==
After it became clear that the production of a feature-length Hellraiser: Origins would not be going ahead, Gerrard began a Kickstarter project to self-publish an art book. With over a hundred and twenty pages, Company of Shadows contains an in-depth exploration into the themes Gerrard used to develop Hellraiser: Origins, as well as new content due to be used in future projects.

On April 30, 2014 the Kickstarter project ended having raised $13,225 in pledges, exceeding its target of $10,000 by thirty-five percent. Six-hundred and fifty-five copies were produced.

== Filmography ==
- 2011 - Battle Los Angeles (Concept Artist)
- 2012 - Wrath of the Titans (Concept Artist)
- 2013 - Hellraiser: Origins (Art Director, Writer, Production Designer)
- 2014 - The Otherworld (Matte Painter)
- 2014 - Teenage Mutant Ninja Turtles
- 2014/I - Seventh Son (Concept Artist)
- 2015 - The Shannara Chronicles (Concept Artist - one episode)
