= Noah Ringer =

American actor and martial artist (born 1996)

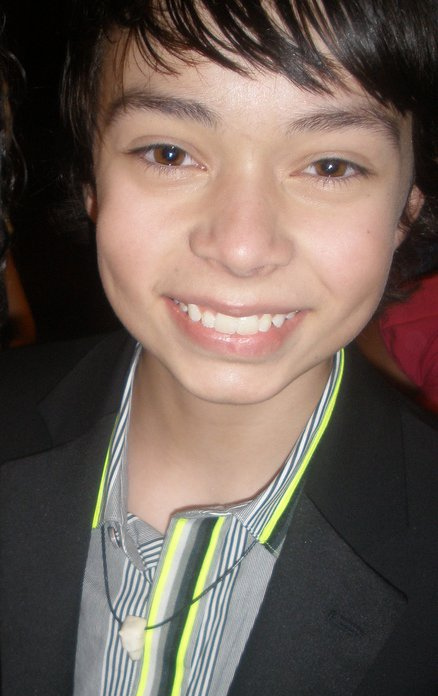
- Ringer at the 2010 New York City premiere of The Last Airbender
- Born: Noah Andrew Ringer; November 18, 1996 (age 29); Dallas, Texas, U.S.
- Occupations: Actor, martial artist
- Years active: 2008–2012

Noah Andrew Ringer (born November 18, 1996) is an American martial artist and former child actor. He starred as Aang in the film The Last Airbender (2010) and played Emmett in Cowboys & Aliens (2011).

== Life and career ==
Ringer was born in Dallas, Texas. When he was ten, his mother enrolled him at ATA Martial Arts in Carrollton, Texas, part of the American Taekwondo Association (ATA). He showed early promise and soon began competing in tournaments. In December 2008, at age twelve, Ringer earned his first degree black belt.

Ringer kept his head shaved, and fellow students nicknamed him "Avatar", after the character Aang in the animated television series Avatar: The Last Airbender. Ringer's taekwondo instructor, Master Eric Pechacek, started watching the show and also noticed the resemblance of Ringer to Aang, in both appearance and personality. He introduced the show to Ringer, who became an immediate fan.

In July 2008, Pechacek received an email from the ATA, inviting any interested students to audition for the role of Aang in The Last Airbender. Pechacek urged Ringer to try out for the part. For the audition video, Ringer dressed in Aang's attire, using his Halloween costume from the previous year. He performed an XMA Jahng Bong routine and recited a few lines. A month after sending in the video, Ringer was called to Philadelphia to meet with director M. Night Shyamalan. A month after that, he was offered the part. Ringer had one month to prepare for the film. He did an intense study with director Linda Seto at the Dallas Young Actors Studio, where he continued classes afterwards. He also began training in different types of martial arts, which continued during the filming process.

In March 2011, Ringer was nominated for Best Performance in a Feature Film by a Leading Young Actor for the 32nd Annual Young Artist Awards. In May 2011, Ringer won the 3rd Annual TheSkyKid.Com "Coming of Age" Best Actor movie award for his performance in The Last Airbender.

In July 2011, Ringer played the role of Emmett Taggart in Cowboys & Aliens, a sci-fi western film directed by Jon Favreau. In May 2013, it was announced that he was cast alongside Jodelle Ferland and Michael Eklund in The Peppercorn Chronicles, a teen fantasy film loosely based on the 2011 short film Mrs Peppercorn's Magical Reading Room directed by Mike Lè Han (who was also set to direct the feature film adaptation) that was intended to be the first film in a trilogy titled Peppercorn. Production was expected to begin in February 2014 in the United States and Hungary. However, none of the planned films were ever materialized.

=== Martial arts ===
Ringer's first ATA tournament was the World Championships in Arkansas. He won first place in every category he competed in. After watching the "extreme" routines at that tournament, Ringer decided to start training in Extreme Martial Arts, or XMA, which involved him choreographing his own moves and choosing his own music. He became proficient with a variety of Eastern weapons, including the bō staff, which his character Aang uses. During his first two years with the ATA, Ringer competed in 25 tournaments, winning 100 medals, 80 of them gold. He was given the "Competitor of the Year" award for the Texas region in February 2008. Ringer won the 2008–2009 title of Texas State Champion in five categories: Traditional Forms, Traditional Weapons, Sparring, X-Treme Forms, and X-Treme Weapons.

For The Last Airbender, Ringer learned baguazhang, tai chi, and Wushu. These styles are "soft", compared to taekwondo, which is a "hard" style. Ringer continues to train in American taekwondo. In October 2010, he earned his second degree black belt. Ringer teaches other students in the ATA, as part of the Leadership Program. He also does gymnastics and has started to learn Choy Li Fut kung fu.

== Personal life ==
Ringer was homeschooled. He has stated that he has some Native American heritage.

== Filmography ==
Year	Film	Role	Notes
2010	The Last Airbender	Aang	
2011	Cowboys & Aliens	Emmett Taggart	

== Awards and nominations ==
Year	Award	Category	Nominated work(s)	Result	Ref.
2011	TheSkyKid.com	"Coming of Age" Best Actor	The Last Airbender	Won	
2011	Young Artist Awards	Best Performance in a Feature Film – Leading Young Actor	The Last Airbender	Nominated	
2011	Golden Raspberry Awards	Worst Screen Couple	The Last Airbender	Nominated	
