= British Soap Award for Best Actress =

Former annual British TV award

- Country: United Kingdom
- First award: 1999
- Final award: 2019

Highlights
- Most wins: Lacey Turner (3)
- Most nominations: Lacey Turner; Jessie Wallace (both 5)

The British Soap Award for Best Actress was an award presented annually by the British Soap Awards from its inception in 1999 until 2019. Alongside Best Actor, the award was voted for by the public. EastEnders is the most awarded soap in the category, with ten wins, while EastEnders actress Lacey Turner is the most awarded actress, with three wins. In 2022, it was confirmed that the category had been replaced by the award for Best Leading Performer. The final winner of the award was Emmerdale actress Lucy Pargeter.

== Winners and nominees ==
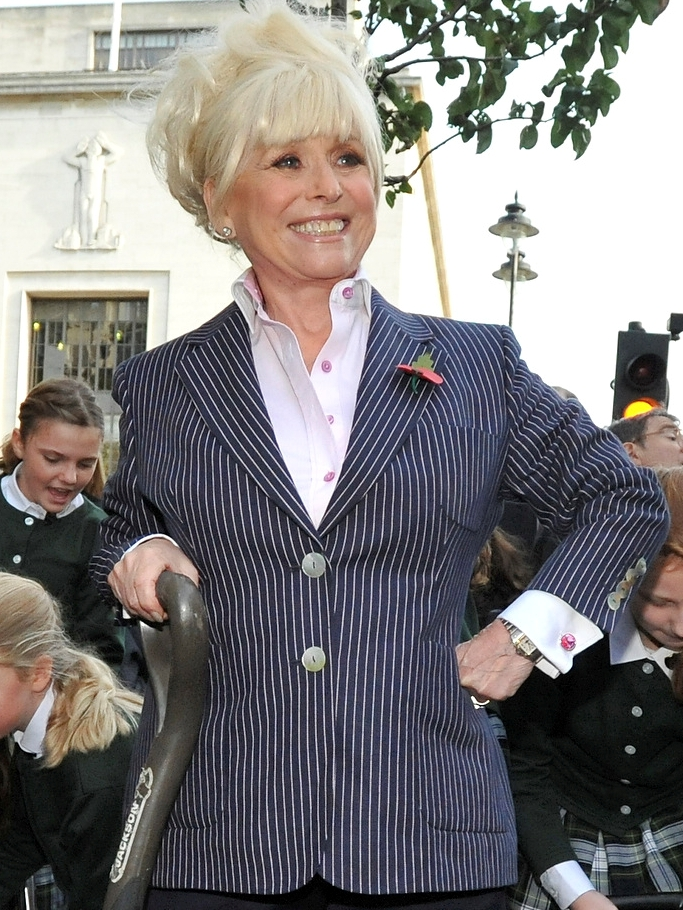
1999 winner Barbara Windsor.

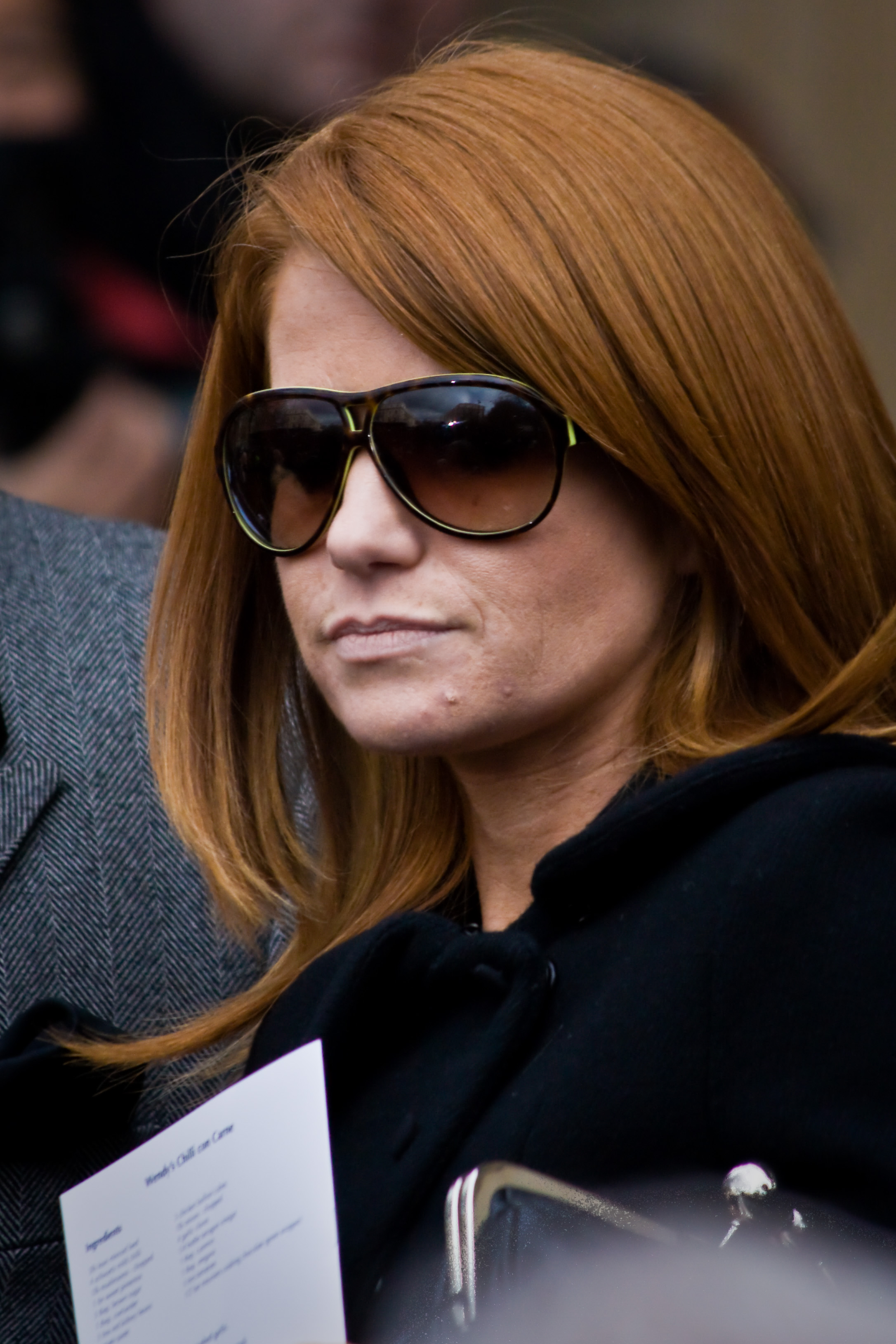
2000 winner Patsy Palmer.

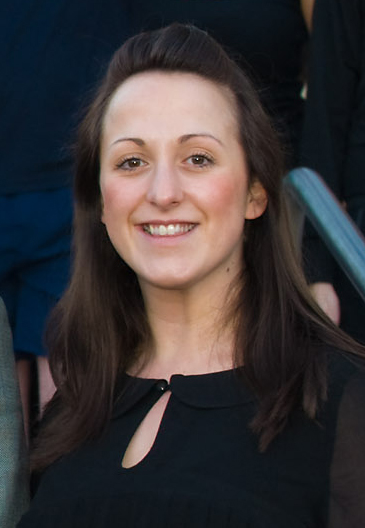
2001 winner Natalie Cassidy.

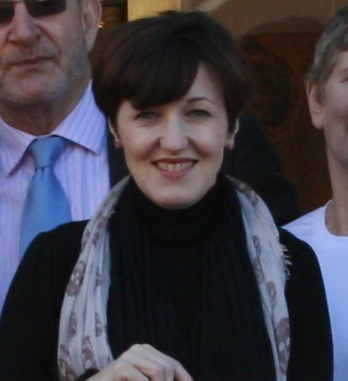
2002 and 2003 winner Kacey Ainsworth.

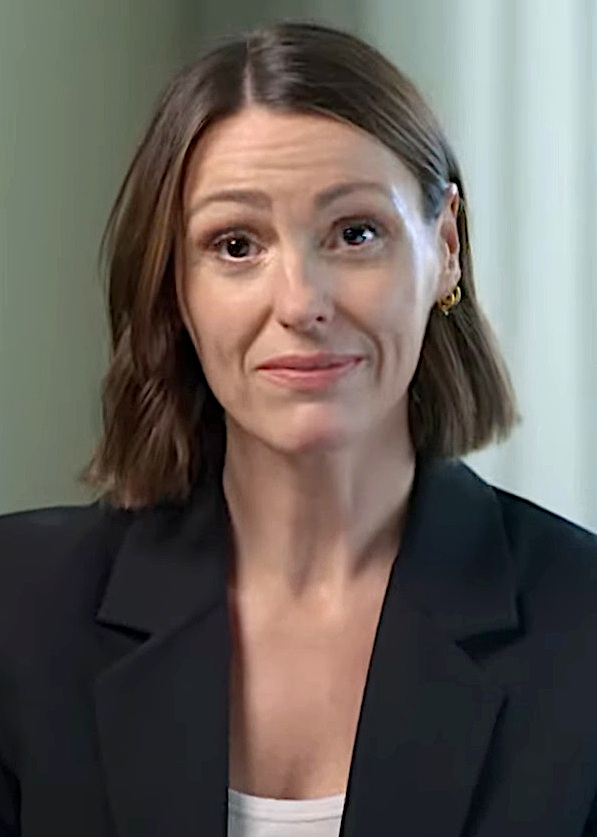
2004 and 2005 winner Suranne Jones.

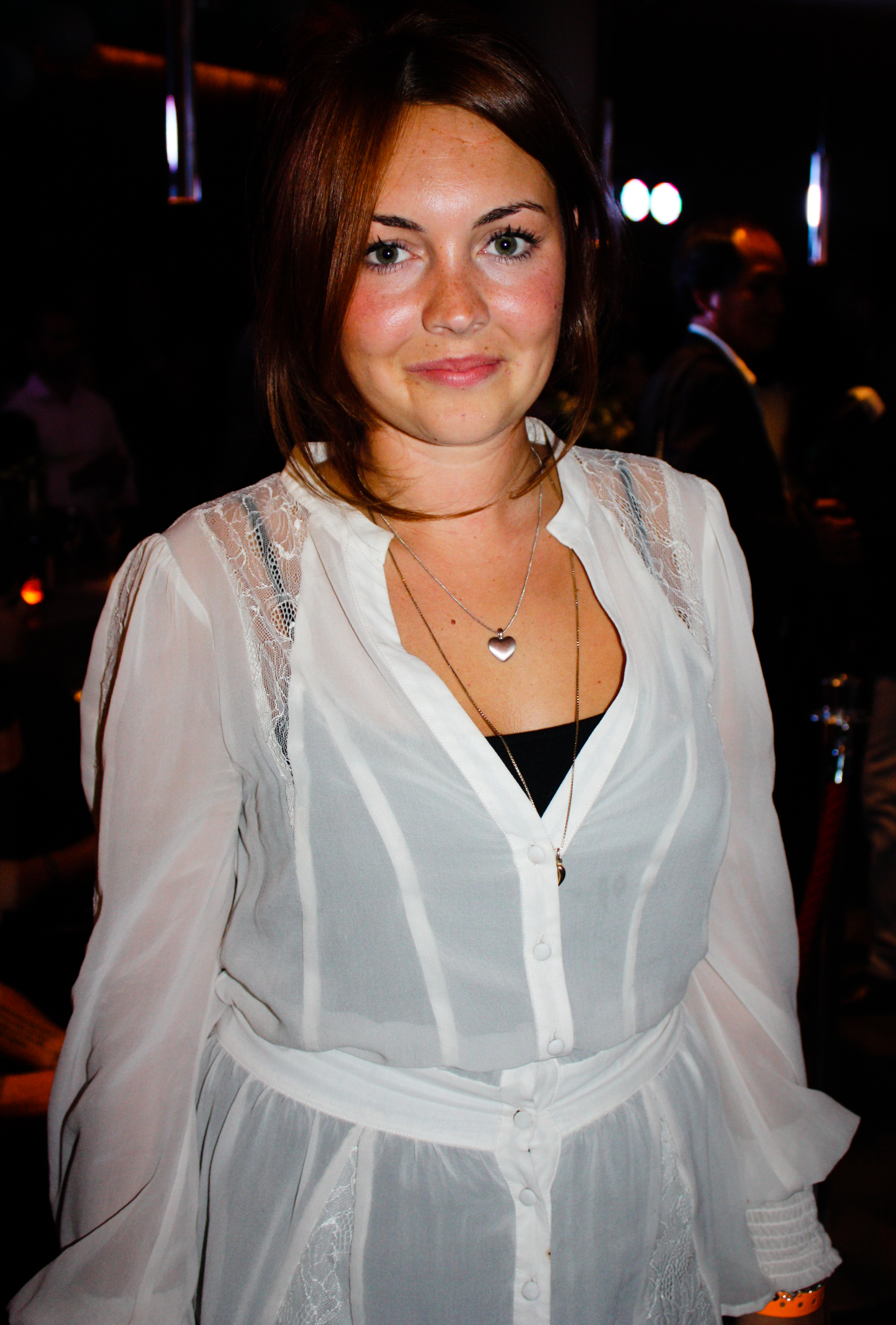
2006, 2010 and 2016 winner Lacey Turner. She is the most awarded recipient.

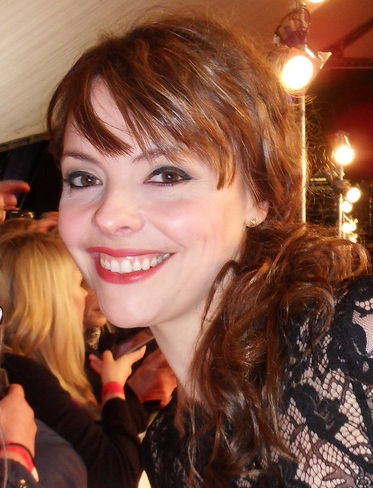
2007 winner Kate Ford.

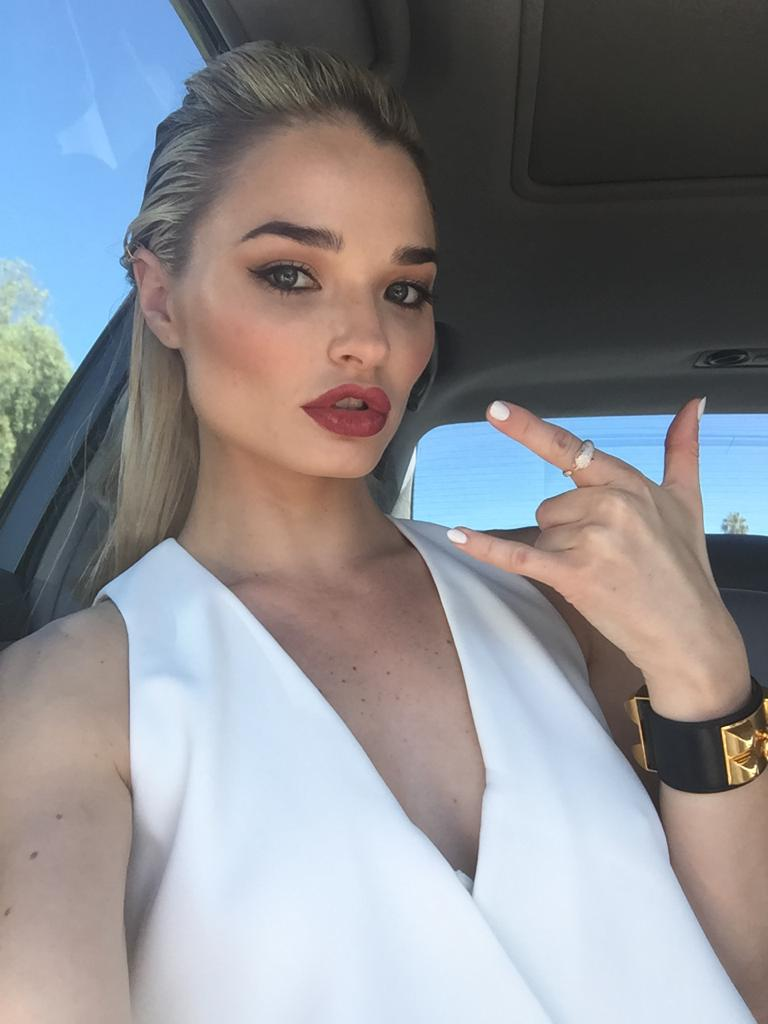
2008 winner Emma Rigby.

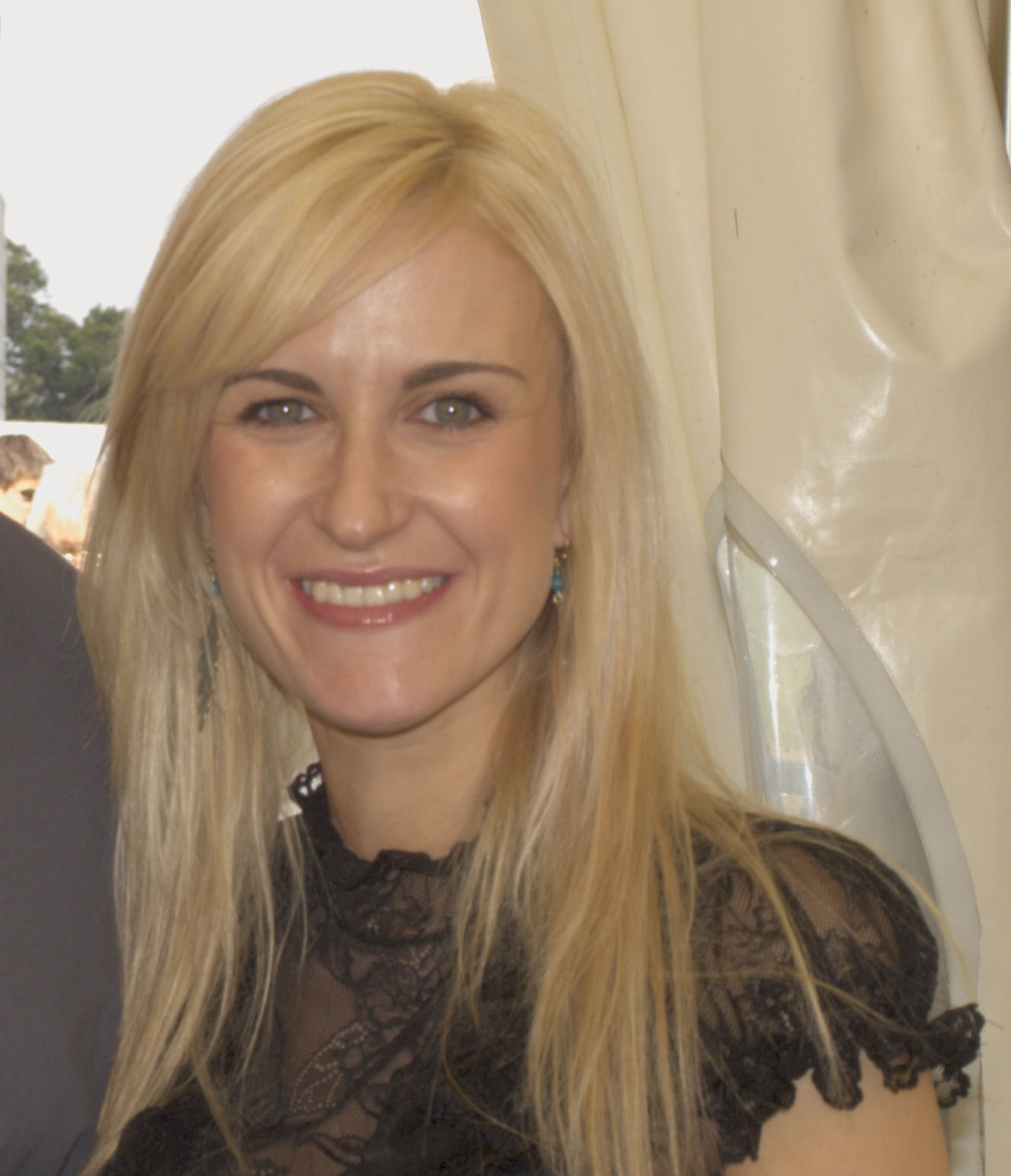
2009 winner Katherine Kelly.

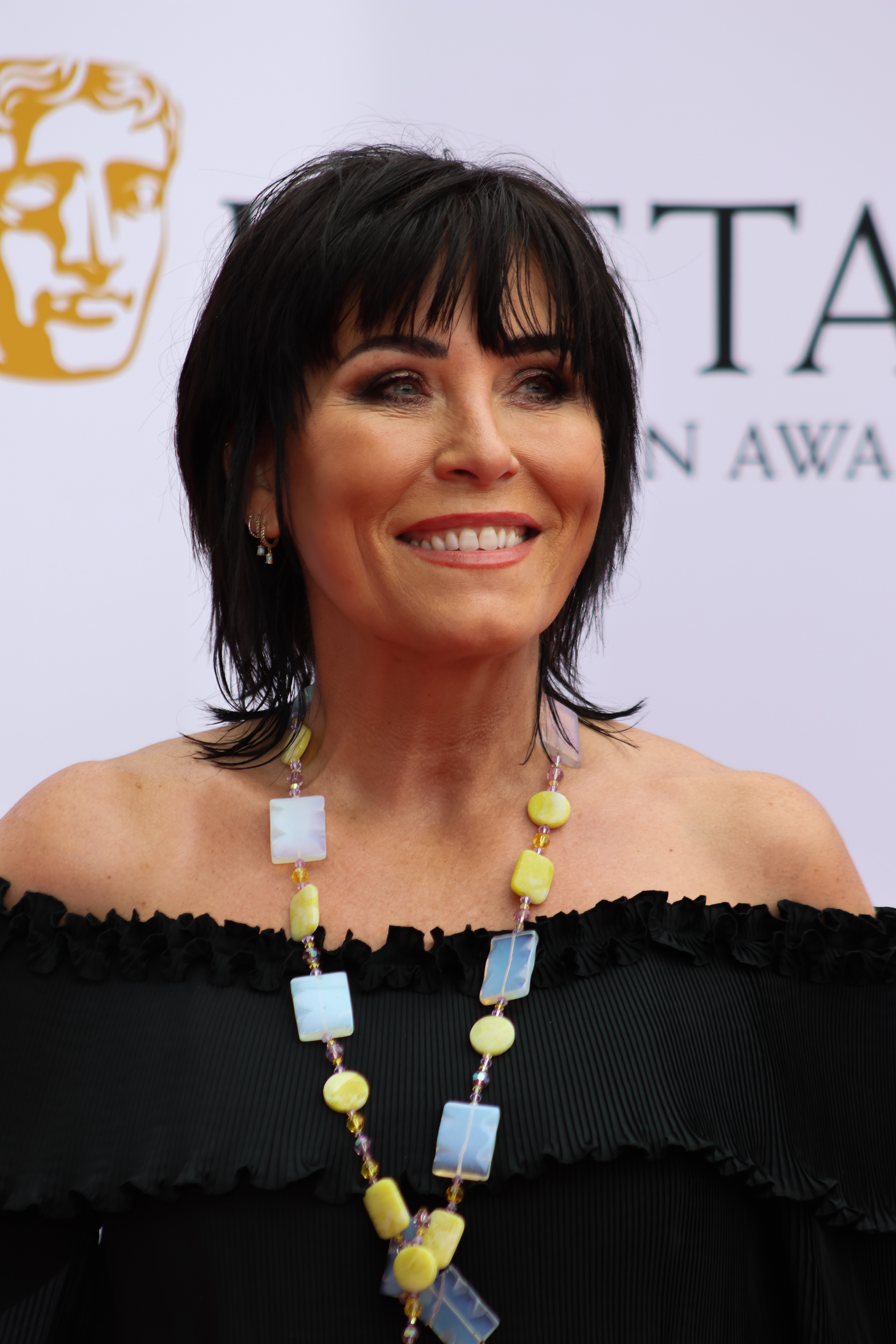
2011 winner Jessie Wallace.

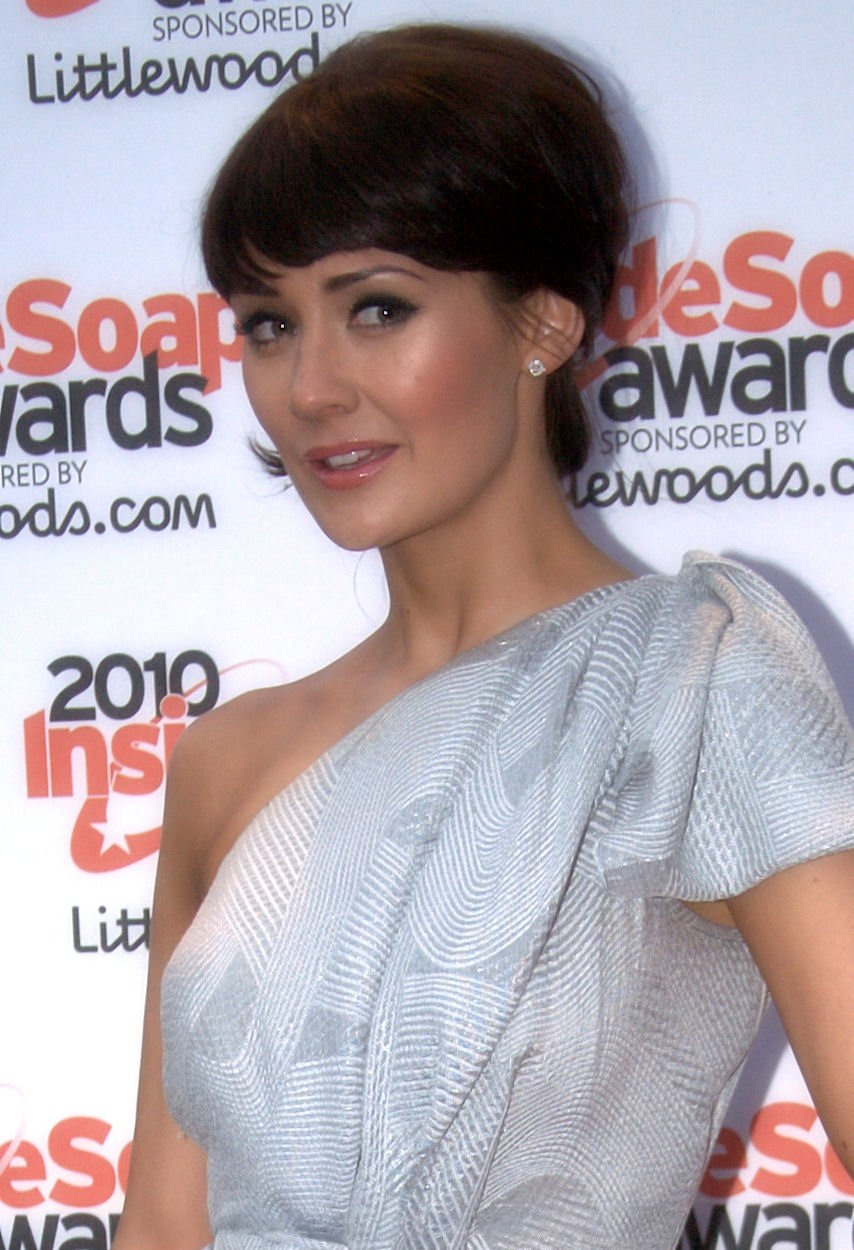
2013 winner Claire Cooper.

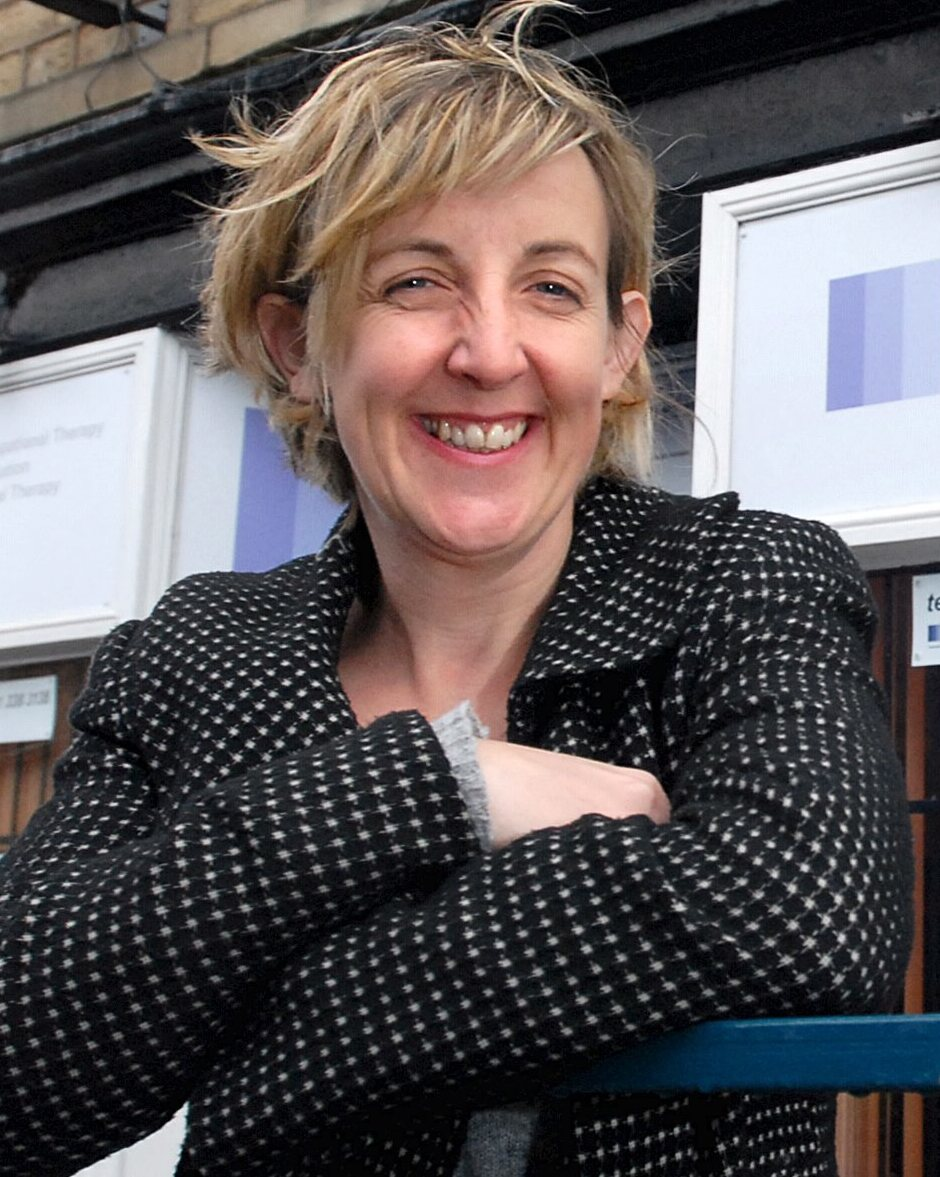
2014 winner Julie Hesmondhalgh.

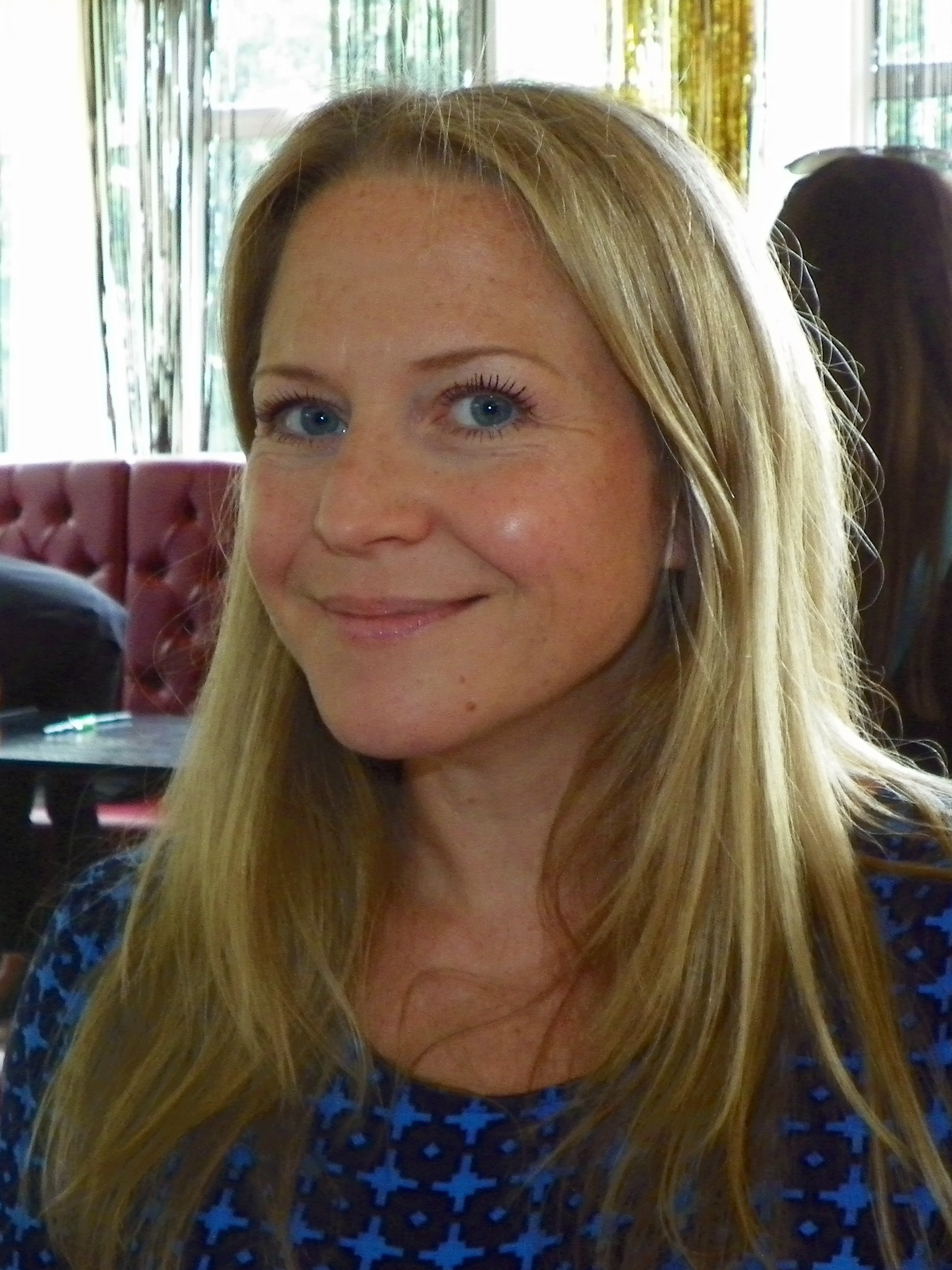
2015 winner Kellie Bright.

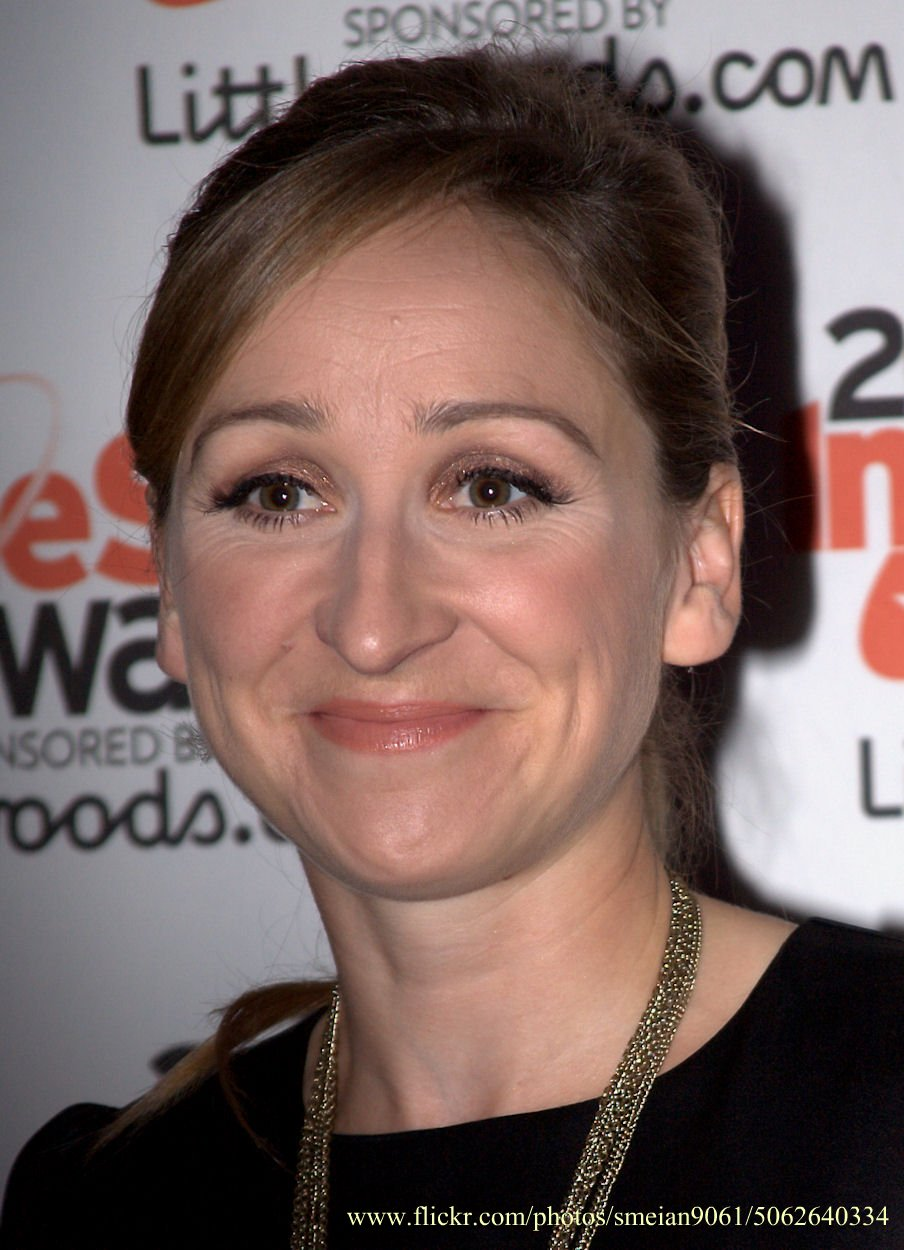
2017 winner Charlotte Bellamy.

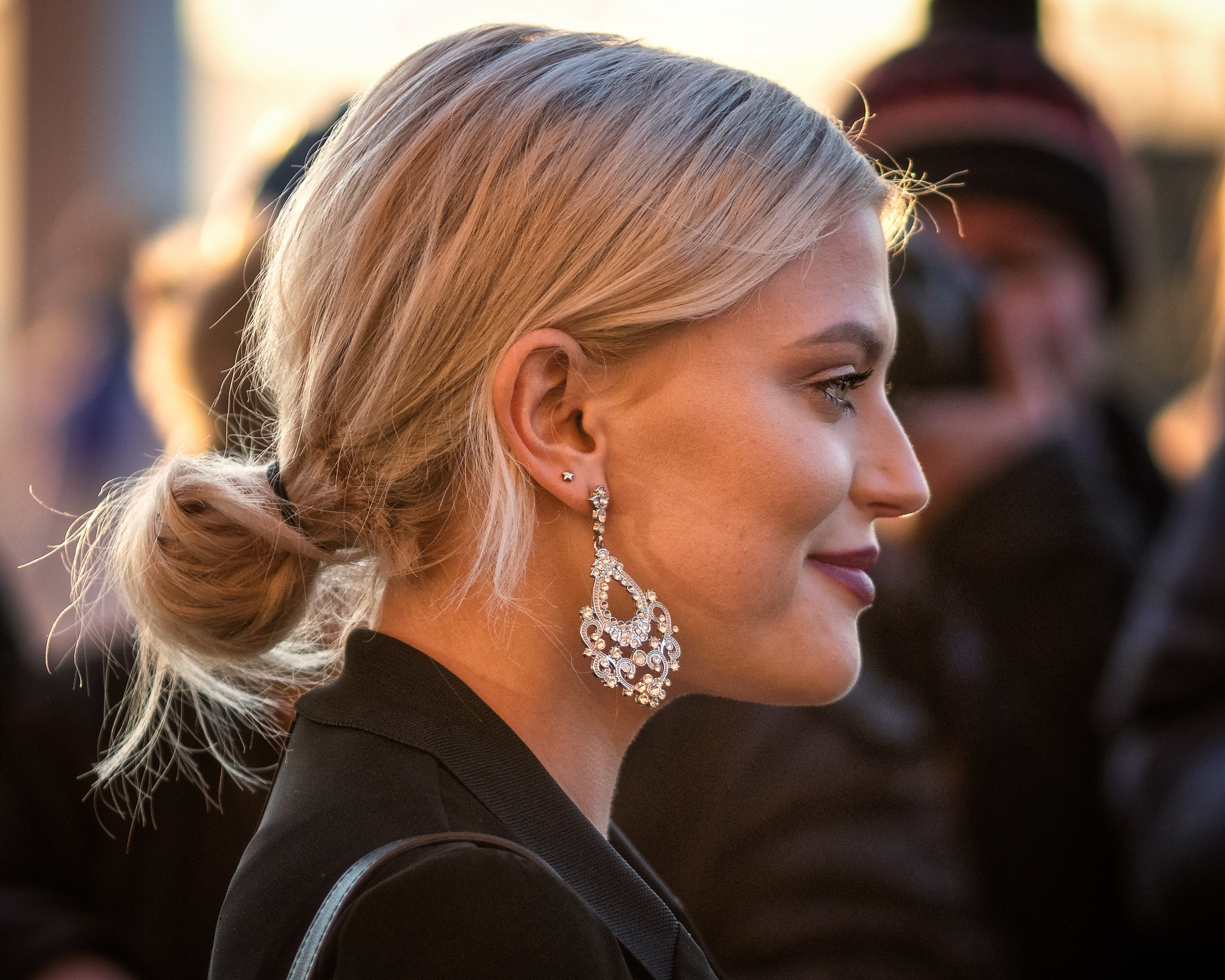
2018 winner Lucy Fallon.

Year	Actress	Role	Soap opera
1999	Barbara Windsor	Peggy Mitchell	EastEnders
1999	Julie Hesmondhalgh	Hayley Patterson	Coronation Street
1999	Patsy Palmer	Bianca Jackson	EastEnders
1999	Lisa Riley	Mandy Dingle	Emmerdale
2000	Patsy Palmer	Bianca Jackson	EastEnders
2000	Lindsey Coulson	Carol Jackson	EastEnders
2000	Samantha Giles	Bernice Blackstock	Emmerdale
2001	Natalie Cassidy	Sonia Jackson	EastEnders
2001	June Brown	Dot Cotton	EastEnders
2002	Kacey Ainsworth	Little Mo Morgan	EastEnders
2002	Tanya Franks	Karen Ellis	Family Affairs
2002	Tamzin Outhwaite	Mel Owen	EastEnders
2002	Jessie Wallace	Kat Slater	EastEnders
2003	Kacey Ainsworth	Little Mo Morgan	EastEnders
2003	Tanya Franks	Karen Ellis	Family Affairs
2004	Suranne Jones	Karen McDonald	Coronation Street
2004	Kacey Ainsworth	Little Mo Mitchell	EastEnders
2004	Kate Ford	Tracy Barlow	Coronation Street
2004	Jessie Wallace	Kat Moon	EastEnders
2005	Suranne Jones	Karen McDonald	Coronation Street
2005	Kacey Ainsworth	Little Mo Mitchell	EastEnders
2005	Emma Atkins	Charity Tate	Emmerdale
2005	Jessie Wallace	Kat Moon	EastEnders
2006	Lacey Turner	Stacey Slater	EastEnders
2006	Sue Cleaver	Eileen Grimshaw	Coronation Street
2006	Kate Ford	Tracy Barlow	Coronation Street
2006	Jessie Wallace	Kat Moon	EastEnders
2007	Kate Ford	Tracy Barlow	Coronation Street
2007	Jessica Fox	Nancy Hayton	Hollyoaks
2007	Ursula Holden-Gill	Alice Dingle	Emmerdale
2007	Lacey Turner	Stacey Slater	EastEnders
2008	Emma Rigby	Hannah Ashworth	Hollyoaks
2008	Charlotte Bellamy	Laurel Thomas	Emmerdale
2008	Jo Joyner	Tanya Branning	EastEnders
2008	Lacey Turner	Stacey Branning	EastEnders
2009	Katherine Kelly	Becky McDonald	Coronation Street
2009	Samantha Janus	Ronnie Mitchell	EastEnders
2009	Jo Joyner	Tanya Branning	EastEnders
2009	Carley Stenson	Steph Cunningham	Hollyoaks
2010	Lacey Turner	Stacey Branning	EastEnders
2010	Charlotte Bellamy	Laurel Thomas	Emmerdale
2010	Katherine Kelly	Becky McDonald	Coronation Street
2010	Nina Wadia	Zainab Masood	EastEnders
2011	Jessie Wallace	Kat Moon	EastEnders
2011	Claire Cooper	Jacqui McQueen	Hollyoaks
2011	Jane Cox	Lisa Dingle	Emmerdale
2011	Katherine Kelly	Becky McDonald	Coronation Street
2012	Alison King	Carla Connor	Coronation Street
2012	Karen Hassan	Lynsey Nolan	Hollyoaks
2012	Jo Joyner	Tanya Jessop	EastEnders
2012	Nina Wadia	Zainab Masood	EastEnders
2013	Claire Cooper	Jacqui McQueen	Hollyoaks
2013	Michelle Keegan	Tina McIntyre	Coronation Street
2013	Jennie McAlpine	Fiz Stape	Coronation Street
2013	Nina Wadia	Zainab Khan	EastEnders
2013	Jessie Wallace	Kat Moon	EastEnders
2014	Julie Hesmondhalgh	Hayley Cropper	Coronation Street
2014	Lindsey Coulson	Carol Jackson	EastEnders
2014	Stephanie Davis	Sinead Roscoe	Hollyoaks
2014	Nikki Sanderson	Maxine Minniver	Hollyoaks
2014	Lacey Turner	Stacey Branning	EastEnders
2015	Kellie Bright	Linda Carter	EastEnders
2015	Natalie Anderson	Alicia Metcalfe	Emmerdale
2015	Laurie Brett	Jane Beale	EastEnders
2015	Alison King	Carla Connor	Coronation Street
2015	Nikki Sanderson	Maxine Minniver	Hollyoaks
2016	Lacey Turner	Stacey Fowler	EastEnders
2016	Alison King	Carla Connor	Coronation Street
2016	Jennifer Metcalfe	Mercedes McQueen	Hollyoaks
2016	Lucy Pargeter	Chas Dingle	Emmerdale
2016	Rakhee Thakrar	Shabnam Masood	EastEnders
2017	Charlotte Bellamy	Laurel Thomas	Emmerdale
2017	Lucy Fallon	Bethany Platt	Coronation Street
2017	Kym Marsh	Michelle Connor	Coronation Street
2017	Anna Passey	Sienna Blake	Hollyoaks
2017	Lacey Turner	Stacey Fowler	EastEnders
2018	Lucy Fallon	Bethany Platt	Coronation Street
2018	Emma Atkins	Charity Dingle	Emmerdale
2018	Anna Passey	Sienna Blake	Hollyoaks
2018	Lacey Turner	Stacey Fowler	EastEnders
2018	Catherine Tyldesley	Eva Price	Coronation Street
2019	Lucy Pargeter	Chas Dingle	Emmerdale
2019	Stephanie Davis	Sinead Shelby	Hollyoaks
2019	Alison King	Carla Connor	Coronation Street
2019	Lauren McQueen	Lily McQueen	Hollyoaks
2019	Lorraine Stanley	Karen Taylor	EastEnders

== Achievements ==
=== Actresses with multiple wins ===
Actress	Role	Soap opera	Wins	Nominations (Note: These nominations did not result in a win.)
Lacey Turner	Stacey Slater	EastEnders	3	5
Kacey Ainsworth	Little Mo Mitchell	EastEnders	2	2
Suranne Jones	Karen McDonald	Coronation Street	2	0

=== Wins by soap ===
Soap opera	Wins	Nominations
EastEnders	10	27
Coronation Street	7	14
Hollyoaks	2	12
Emmerdale	2	10
Family Affairs	0	2
