= Lucy May Barker =

British actress

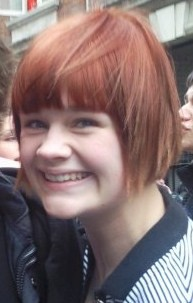
- Born: 4 April 1992 (age 33); Lincoln, Lincolnshire, England
- Occupation: Actress
- Years active: 2001–present

Lucy May Barker (born 4 April 1992) is a British actress.

== Life and career ==
She was born and brought up in Lincoln, Lincolnshire. Most notably, Barker played Ilse in the original London cast of the four-time Olivier Award-winning Spring Awakening which opened in February 2009 at the Lyric Hammersmith. The show transferred to the Novello Theatre in March 2009, and ran until May 2009.

In the 2001–2003 tours of the musical Annie, Barker played the title role to critical acclaim. In 2009, she also appeared in the London premiere of the musical Zombie Prom at the Landor Theatre, playing Ginger, and in The Impressions Show with Culshaw and Stephenson playing George, one of the Famous Five, with the comedian Jon Culshaw.

In 2010, Barker appeared at the Royal National Theatre playing Millie in Really Old, Like Forty Five, a new play by Tamsin Oglesby. The play opened on 3 February, following previews from 27 January 2010, in the Cottesloe, and was directed by Anna Mackmin. The play also starred Gawn Grainger, Judy Parfitt and Marcia Warren.

Also in 2010, in the season at the Open Air Theatre, Regent's Park, Barker played Mercy Lewis in The Crucible, starring alongside Oliver Ford Davies, Emma Cunniffe, Susan Engel and Patrick Godfrey.

Barker returned to the Royal National Theatre to play the part of Marina (amongst others) in Mike Bartlett's new play, Earthquakes in London, directed by Rupert Goold'.

In late 2010, Barker filmed a small role in The Woman in Black, starring Daniel Radcliffe, and was also seen on CBBC's show Scoop, with Shaun Williamson and Mark Benton, in early 2011.

At the start of 2011, Barker toured the UK playing Clarissa in The Reluctant Debutante, with Jane Asher, Clive Francis and Belinda Lang.

Between 24 September and 5 November 2011, Barker played Johanna in Sweeney Todd: The Demon Barber of Fleet Street at the Chichester Festival Theatre, with Michael Ball as Sweeney Todd and Imelda Staunton as Mrs Lovett. The production transferred to London's West End along with Lucy, opening at the Adelphi Theatre on 10 March 2012.

In 2016, Barker started playing the role of Sophie Sheridan in the 2016 UK tour of "Mamma Mia!", opening at the Bristol Hippodrome and performing at many venues such as the Edinburgh Playhouse and the Theatre Royal, Glasgow.

In 2017 she recorded two songs for the album Wit & Whimsy - Songs by Alexander S. Bermange (one solo and one featuring all of the album's 23 artists), which reached No. 1 in the iTunes comedy album chart.

In 2019, she returned to Mamma Mia as Sophie, this time at the West End's Novello Theatre, replacing Georgia Louise who departed the cast prematurely due to illness.
