= Tanya Franks =

English actress (born 1967)

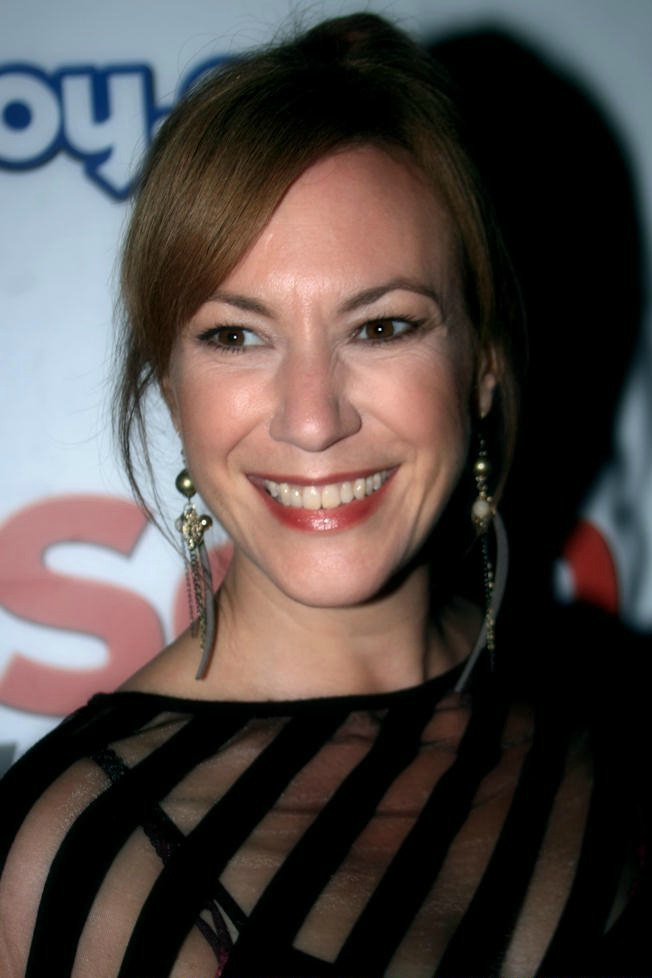
- Franks in 2014
- Born: Tanya Christine Franks; 16 August 1967 (age 59); Plumstead, London, England
- Occupations: Actress, writer, producer
- Years active: 1986–present
- Partner: Scott Mitchell (2023–present)
- Website: tanyafranks.com

Tanya Christine Franks (born 16 August 1967) is an English actress. She is best known for her role as Rainie Cross in the BBC soap opera EastEnders.

== Career ==
=== 1986–2006 ===
Franks worked for 14 years in theatre both in the UK and abroad. Her roles included the title role in Tess at The Kings Head Theatre in London in 1989 which was Time Out's Critics Choice, and Sylv in Steven Berkoff's 25th Anniversary production of East at the Vaudeville Theatre in London's West End and on tour. Tanya then rose to prominence when her TV career began in 2000, after being cast in the Channel 5 soap opera Family Affairs as Karen Ellis. Franks continued in the soap opera for three years, with storylines including a cancer scare, infertility, surrogacy, and a child custody battle, before leaving the series in 2003. In 2004, Franks was cast as DI Rowanne Morell in the long-running ITV1 police serial-drama The Bill. Franks stayed with the serial for over a year, with her character investigating various murders of police officers and police corruption.

In 2006, Franks starred opposite Sharon Horgan and Rebekah Staton in the BBC Three comedy series Pulling. Franks was cast as Karen, a promiscuous, raunchy, aggressive primary school teacher, who drinks heavily and is not suited to her job, for which she was nominated at The British Comedy Awards in 2009. The sitcom ran for two series and a special feature episode, and gained a BAFTA nomination for best comedy series and won the South Bank Show Award for Best Comedy.

=== 2007–present ===
In July 2007, it was announced that Franks would play the role of Tanya Branning's (Jo Joyner) sister, Rainie Cross in the BBC One soap opera EastEnders for a week-long stint from 2 August 2007. Franks returned to EastEnders as Rainie in January 2008, and again in August 2010. She returned again in April 2011, before departing once more later that year. She made a surprise return to the show on 16 June 2014 and departed on 15 February 2015. EastEnders announced on 18 January 2018 that Franks would make a guest appearance the following day and return on a permanent basis later in the year. Franks made her full-time return on 24 April 2018. It was announced in June 2022 that Franks had left the role of Rainie. Her final scenes aired on 29 June 2022. She returned for a brief stint on 23 August until 25 August 2022.

In 2008, Franks starred as Sandra Farrell in the BBC Two mocumentary The Cup. In 2010, Franks appeared in an episode of the E4 teen drama Skins. Also in 2010, she appeared in an episode of the BBC1 time-travelling drama Ashes to Ashes. From September 2010 to August 2011, Franks starred as a series regular in the CBBC comedy serial Hotel Trubble. Franks also appears in Episode 7, Series 9 of New Tricks as literary agent Roxanne Guthrie. In 2013, she was a guest lead in an episode of "Pramface" as Fiona. Tanya plays Richard Burton's wife, Sybil, in the 2012 made-for-television film Liz & Dick. Also in 2013, Tanya played Lucy Stevens, sister to Detective Sergeant Ellie Miller played by Olivia Colman, in the series Broadchurch. She also played Mandy in the E4 sitcom Chewing Gum in 2015 and earlier in 2016 and 2018 she played Carol in the hit BBC comedy series Mum. In 2018, Franks appeared in an episode of Inside No 9.

In addition to her television work, Franks has also appeared in further theatre roles, including starring as Sylv in Steven Berkoff’s 25th anniversary production of "East" at the Vaudeville Theatre in London’s West End, leading roles at the Royal National Theatre in "Sing Yer Heart Out For The Lads" by Roy Williams in 2004, "The Black Album" by Hanif Kureishi in 2009, and in the premier run of Really Old, Like Forty Five in 2010. In 2013 she toured as Irene Adler in the new mystery "Sherlock Holmes: The Best Kept Secret", and played the title role in Bertolt Brecht's "The Good Person of Sichuan" at the Mercury Theatre in Colchester. In 2016 Tanya co-starred at The Menier Chocolate Factory in The Truth written by Florian Zeller and adapted by Oscar winning playwright Christopher Hampton. Following its sell-out run the production transferred to the Wyndham's Theatre in London's West End and was nominated for a Laurence Olivier Award for Best New Comedy. In 2022, Tanya starred as Emilia at The Royal National Theatre’s production of Othello by William Shakespeare. In 2023, she starred in the national tour of the newly rewritten production of Gary Barlow and Tim Firth’s “Calendar Girls the Musical” as the lead role of Annie. Following that, in 2024, Tanya played Dean Amy Katz, a Harvard University professor, in the UK premier of “The Power Of Sail” at the Menier Chocolate Factory, written by Paul Grellong.

== Stock-pot Productions ==
=== 1993–present ===
Franks founded Stock-pot Productions in 1993. Theatre credits included Scenes of Shaw at London's Theatre Museum starring Les Dennis and the late Paul Eddington; Deckchairs at London's Kings Head Theatre in which Tanya also co-starred. Co-productions included the national tour of You Don't Kiss and All Fall Away which the Guardian named Pick of the Week with Tanya playing the lead role at the Latchmere Theatre (now Theatre 503). The company has made three short films, the last of which Franks wrote, produced, and starred in, entitled One Day. It was officially selected at several national and international film festivals and was Kodak best short film finalist. In addition to Franks, the film starred Tim McInnerny as well as Toby Stephens in a small part.

== Personal life ==
Franks has been in a relationship with recruitment consultant Scott Mitchell, the widower of Dame Barbara Windsor, since July 2023.

== Filmography ==
| Year | Title | Role | Notes |
|---|---|---|---|
| 2000–2003 | Family Affairs | Karen Ellis | Regular role; 147 episodes |
| 2004 | Missing | Woman | Short film; also writer and producer |
| 2004–2005 | The Bill | DCI Morrell | Regular role; 22 episodes |
| 2005 | Holby City | Tina Papworth | Episode: "Live and Let Die" |
| 2005 | Chromophobia | Christine | Film |
| 2006 | Doctors | Juliet Nicholls | Episode: "Marilyn, Sometimes" |
| 2006–2009 | Pulling | Karen | Main role; 13 episodes |
| 2007 | One Day | Cherie | short film; also writer and producer |
| 2007–2008, 2010–2011, 2014–2015, 2018–2022 | EastEnders | Rainie Cross | Regular role; 382 episodes |
| 2008 | The Cup | Sandra Farrell | Main role; 6 episodes |
| 2010 | Skins | Ruth Byatt | Episode: "Cook" |
| 2010 | Ashes to Ashes | Marjorie Blonde | Series 3: Episode 1 |
| 2010–2011 | Hotel Trubble | Dolly | Regular role; 26 episodes |
| 2011 | Island | Ruby | Film |
| 2011 | Coming Up | Shirley | Episode: "Geronimo" |
| 2012 | New Tricks | Roxanne Guthrie | Episode: "Dead Poets" |
| 2012 | Get Lucky | Barbara | Short film |
| 2012 | Liz & Dick | Sybil Burton | Television film |
| 2013 | Pramface | Fiona | Episode: "Super Mum and Hardguy 2000" |
| 2013 | Love Matters | Denise | Episode: "Kitten Chic" |
| 2013 | The Magnificent Eleven | Clare | Film |
| 2013 | Pieces | Mother | Short film |
| 2013–2015 | Broadchurch | Lucy Stevens | Main role; 12 episodes |
| 2014 | Judith | Judith's mother | Short film; voice only |
| 2015–2017 | Chewing Gum | Mandy | Recurring role; 5 episodes |
| 2016 | Vera | Lorraine Hallam | Episode: "The Moth Catcher" |
| 2016 | Grantchester | Rita Jones | Series 2: Episode 5 |
| 2016 | Moon Dogs | Pam | Film |
| 2016 | Agriculture | Etta | TV miniseries |
| 2016 | The Coopers vs the Rest | Tess | Episode: "Pilot" |
| 2016 | We Still Steal the Old Way | Governor Pryce | Film |
| 2016–2018 | Mum | Carol | 3 episodes |
| 2017–2019 | Porters | Jane Bison | Main role; 6 episodes |
| 2018 | Inside No. 9 | Tracey | Episode: "Zanzibar" |
| 2018 | The Split | Sarah Pope | Series 1: Episode 1 |
| 2018 | Silent Witness | Jackie Emmans | Episodes: "Family: Parts 1 & 2" |
| 2018 | Aux | Jane Dale | Film |
| 2018 | Urban Myths | Becca | Episode: "Public Enemy" |
| 2018 | The Quarter: Teaser | Sarah | Short film |
| 2022 | My Love Affair with Marriage | Teacher #2 | Voice only |

== Accolades ==
| Year | Award | Category | Nominee/work | Result | Ref. |
|---|---|---|---|---|---|
| 2002 | The British Soap Awards | Best Actress | Family Affairs | Nominated | |
| 2003 | The British Soap Awards | Best Actress | Family Affairs | Nominated | |
| 2009 | British Comedy Awards | Best Female Newcomer | Pulling | Nominated | |
| 2014 | Inside Soap Awards | Best Bitch | EastEnders | Longlisted | |
| 2018 | Inside Soap Awards | Best Bad Girl | EastEnders | Shortlisted | |
| 2018 | Inside Soap Awards | Best Partnership (shared with Jake Wood) | EastEnders | Longlisted | |
| 2019 | National Television Awards | Serial Drama Performance | EastEnders | Longlisted | |
| 2019 | Inside Soap Awards | Best Bad Girl | EastEnders | Shortlisted | |
| 2021 | Inside Soap Awards | Best Partnership (shared with Ricky Champ) | EastEnders | Longlisted | |
