= Really Old, Like Forty Five =

Play written by Tamsin Oglesby

- Original language: English
- Written by: Tamsin Oglesby

Premiere
- Date: 29 July 2010
- Place: Cottesloe Theatre, London, United Kingdom

Really Old, Like Forty Five is a play by Tamsin Oglesby. The world premiere was at the National Theatre's Cottesloe on 3 February 2010, following previews from 27 January 2010. The production was directed by Anna Mackmin, designed by Lez Brotherston with lighting by Mark Henderson.

== Original Cast ==
- Millie - Lucy May Barker
- Mike - Paul Bazely
- Cathy - Amelia Bullmore
- Amanda - Tanya Franks
- Robbie - Gawn Grainger
- Dylan - Thomas Jordan
- Mimi - Michela Meazza
- Lyn - Judy Parfitt
- Monroe - Paul Ritter
- Alice - Marcia Warren
