= Sadie Lloyd =

- Family Affairs character
- Portrayed by: Barbara Young
- Duration: 1998–2005
In-universe information
- Occupation: Retired
- Sisters: Gloria Hurst
- Husband: Jeff Lloyd (2004)
- Daughters: Pamela Hargreaves
- Nieces: Kelly Hurst

Sadie Lloyd (previously Hargreaves) was a fictional character in the UK soap opera Family Affairs, played by Barbara Young from 1998 until 2005.

== Storylines ==
Sadie first appeared in late November 1998 as Pamela Tripp's gossipy and flamboyant mother, a former stage actor. Sadie then took a job working for the villainous Pete Callan serving behind the bar at bar/restaurant The Lock, and became one of Pete's few friends. She refused to believe that her daughter Pamela was being stalked by a former client, but after Pamela killed him in self-defence, assisted her daughter in disposing of the body and keeping the incident secret. After the body was found in 1999 Pamela accepted full responsibility for the crime, and Sadie was not charged. Pamela went to prison begging Sadie to forget about her and to never visit her in prison. Sadie apparently followed this instruction, and Pamela was rarely mentioned for several years. Sadie followed Pete to continue working for him at his new pub The Black Swan in 2000.

During her time on Stanley Street, Sadie began opening her home to various lodgers. In 2001, her sister, Gloria along with her husband Barry and their daughter Kelly came over for a visit from Australia. When Barry and Gloria returned to Australia, Kelly stayed in Charnham with Sadie for a year. Kelly died on New Year's Eve 2002, after falling down the stairs after an argument with Matt Ellis, the father of Kelly's daughter Grace (Kelly had agreed to be a surrogate mother for Matt and his wife Karen Ellis and had had an affair with Karen). Sadie was left devastated. In late 2003, Sadie took a job at Dusty's Stores, in addition to her job at the pub and quickly made friends with Myra Costello, whose family had recently arrived in the area.

In early 2004, Sadie began seeing Jeff Lloyd. Though embarrassed by his social gaffes she enjoyed his generosity with money, especially since she was facing financial ruin having run up large credit cards debts while defaulting on her home mortgage repayments. Learning that Jeff was dying, Sadie agreed to marry him, seeing it as a way out of her financial predicament, and she became Sadie Lloyd. Jeff died soon after the wedding, however his estranged daughter contested the will and Sadie got nothing, and was forced to put her home on the market. Number 6 was purchased by her friends and lodgers Doug and Cat MacKenzie.

By mid-2005, Sadie's health was rapidly on the decline following a stroke. Pam returned to Charnham after being tracked down by Pete. Pam was revealed to be living in Birmingham, having been paroled a year earlier, working as a maid. Pam and Sadie had a difficult time reconnecting when they returned, even though Sadie was understanding about Pam having come out as a lesbian. In the end, things became so strained, Pam decided to return to Birmingham with Teresa and Sadie went into Sheltered housing outside of London. When Pete died after a shootout with SO19 Officers in September 2005, Cat phoned Sadie to inform her of his death. On the day of Pete's funeral, Cat revealed that Sadie had mentioned she wasn't up to making the journey to Charnham. This was the last that was heard of Sadie.

== Reception ==
A reporter from Soaplife said "comic turn of the month" for November 1999. The referenced storyline involved Sadie performing at a talent contest but being mistaken for a drag queen. While another described her as "always the laugh and soul of the party, the one who picks people up when they're down and takes them in when they're homeless."
