= Allsorts (TV series) =

1994 British TV children's series (1987–1995)

- Also known as: Gigglish Allsorts
- Starring: Andrew Wightman; Wayne Jackman; Virginia Radcliffe; Vivienne Mckone; Jane Cox; Julie Westwood; Charles Roberts
- Country of origin: United Kingdom
- Original language: English
- No. of series: 9
- No. of episodes: 296

Production
- Running time: Original series; 20 minutes (1987-1990); 15 minutes (1991-1994); 10 minutes (1995); Revived series; 11 minutes
- Production company: Granada Television

Original release
- Network: ITV (CITV)
- Release: 7 January 1987 – 19 December 1995

Allsorts (later renamed Gigglish Allsorts in 1994) is a British educational comedy series for children that was produced for ITV by Granada Television. The programmes aired from 7 January 1987 to 19 December 1995 and covered a range of children's learning activities.

== History ==
In common with many of ITV's educational children's programmes of the era, Allsorts – first screened in January 1986 – was originally intended to run for only one series while ITV's flagship children's series, Rainbow, was off air that year. The first series ran until July, but despite moderate popularity in its first run, Granada decided not to renew the series and, instead, initially opted in favour of Allsorts predecessor, the pre-school orientated series Our Backyard (which had already been on air since August 1984), largely because the latter could be made more quickly and cheaply. But, after failing to attract enough viewers in its third run in late 1986, Our Backyard was cancelled and Allsorts was brought back for a second series in January 1987 and proved so popular with both pre-schoolers and older children that it was subsequently recommissioned for a further seven series, before it was eventually dropped in 1995.

The series was characterised by its quirky humour, songs and entertaining storylines, which the characters would have to discover, solve or enjoy. It starred Andrew Wightman as Bonzo and Wayne Jackman as Jiffy, who starred in the series throughout its entire run. Wayne and Andrew were originally joined by Vivienne Mckone as 'Natty' and Virginia Radcliffe as 'Spike The Dog'. Natty and Spike were later dropped from the cast and Radcliffe was promoted to the role of Virginia, replacing Natty. In the early 1990s Virginia Radcliffe left the cast and was replaced by Jane Cox as 'JJ'. Puppet characters were later introduced. The first was Box (a talking box) operated by Julie Westwood. The final addition to the cast was Moudly The Mole, operated by Robert Skidmore who co-built the puppet with Daryl Worby and also rebuilt Box .

The series was renamed Gigglish Allsorts in 1994, with a new set of titles, a new house and new music. However, by this time, viewing figures were on the wane, despite the introduction of a zany Jack In The Box played by Fred Feast and Granada decided that the show had become a shadow of its former self. After a decade-long run, the series was cancelled at the end of its ninth series a year later, in part due to Granada discontinuing many of its lower budget programmes. The final episode was screened on 12 December 1995. Jane Cox later joined Emmerdale and Andrew Wightman became series producer of Granada's Stars in Their Eyes.

== Cast ==
- Jiffy – Wayne Jackman (Series 1–9)
- Bonzo – Andrew Wightman (Series 1–9)
- Natty – Vivienne Mckone (Series 1–3)
- Spike The Dog – Virginia Radcliffe (Series 1–3)
- Virginia – Virginia Radcliffe (Series 4)
- JJ – Jane Cox (Series 5–9)
- Box – Julie Westwood (Series 5–9)
- Mouldy – Robert Skidmore (series 7–9)

== Transmission guide ==
Series	Episodes	Originally released	
Series	Episodes	First released	Last released
1	26	7 January 1987	1 July 1987
2	38	6 April 1988	21 December 1988
3	30	9 August 1989	14 March 1990
4	26	19 September 1990	27 March 1991
5	18	16 October 1991	26 February 1992
6	18	6 January 1993	5 May 1993
7	10	6 January 1994	10 March 1994
8	19	6 September 1994	17 January 1995
9	14	12 September 1995	19 December 1995

== UK VHS releases ==
- "A bumper box of Allsorts" released 1994
- "Allsorts of fun..." released 1995
