= Karen Ellis =

Fictional character from Family Affairs

- Family Affairs character
- Portrayed by: Tanya Franks
- Duration: 2000–2003
- First appearance: 26 November 2000
- Last appearance: 4 September 2003
In-universe information
- Occupation: Barmaid
- Brothers: Jim Webb
- Husband: Matt Ellis (2001–)
- Daughters: Grace Ellis (adoptive)
- Nephews: Paul Webb

Karen Ellis (also Webb) is a fictional character from the Channel 5 soap opera Family Affairs, played by Tanya Franks. The character first appeared on 26 November 2000, and departed on 4 September 2003.

== Storylines ==
Karen first arrived in Charnham in November 2000 with her husband, Matt Ellis to stay with Matt's sister Nikki Warrington and her family. Karen's brother Jim soon followed. Karen quickly found employment as a barmaid at the local pub, the Black Swan. Matt and Karen had been engaged for a number of years, with Matt proposing and Karen frequently turning down his proposal, In 2001, Karen softened and agreed to marry Matt. Karen and Jim's younger brother Paul arrived on the scene and turn the family's life upside down with the numerous scrapes he got into. It was later revealed that Karen and Jim weren't Paul's siblings, but his aunt and father. Karen was a shoulder to cry on when Paul was rejected by his biological mother, Linda.

Prior to the wedding, Karen discovered a cancerous lump in her breast and underwent surgery that left her unable to bear children. Matt and Karen didn't need to look very hard to find a surrogate when Kelly Hurst, Sadie Hargreaves's niece agreed to carry their baby. In 2002, Karen began to have doubts about her marriage to Matt and began an affair with Kelly. Matt, incensed with rage began proceedings for custody of their daughter, Grace. Things came to a head when Kelly fell down the stairs on New Year's Eve after an argument with Matt. For a long time Karen blamed Matt but they eventually managed to work things out. In September 2003, Karen and Matt after having patched up their marriage, left Charnham for Spain with Grace and Jim. The decision was partly based on the fact Jim was covering his own back after a scam with local dodgy dealer Gabriel Drummond went wrong.

== Reception ==
A reporter from Soaplife branded Karen and Kelly's shared a "tangled relationship". They opined that "one whiff of lesbian love triangles, surrogate mums and tug-of-love baby battles and the tabloids would have a field day. Stories don't come much more salacious." For her portrayal of the role, Franks was nominated for the British Soap Award for Best Actress in 2002.
