= Sarah Sugden (2005 character) =

Fictional character from Emmerdale

- Emmerdale character
- Katie Hill as Sarah Sugden (2021)
- Portrayed by: Lily-May Bartley (2005); Lucy Warren (2005); Amber Child-Cavill (2006–2007); Sophia Amber Moore (2007–2016); Katie Hill (2017–present)
- Duration: 2005–present
- First appearance: 6 June 2005
- Introduced by: Keith Richardson
- Crossover appearances: Corriedale (2026)
In-universe information
- Other names: Sarah Gallagher
- Family: Sugden
- Father: Andy Sugden
- Mother: Debbie Dingle
- Stepfather: Pete Barton; Chris
- Stepmother: Katie Sugden; Jo Stiles
- Brothers: Jack Sugden
- Husband: Jacob Gallagher (2026–present)
- Adoptive daughters: Leyla Sugden
- Grandfathers: Billy Hopwood; Cain Dingle; Jack Sugden (adoptive)
- Grandmothers: Trisha Hopwood; Charity Dingle; Sarah Sugden (adoptive)
- Uncles: Daz Eden; Nate Robinson; Noah Dingle; Kyle Dingle; Moses Dingle; Isaac Dingle; Ryan Stocks; Robert Sugden (adoptive); John Sugden (adoptive)
- Aunts: Victoria Sugden (adoptive); Leyla Sugden
- First cousins: Frankie Robinson; Oscar Grisham; Sebastian White (adoptive); Harry Sugden (adoptive)
- Other relatives: Zak Dingle; Faith Dingle; Sam Dingle; Marlon Dingle; Chas Dingle; Mandy Dingle; Tina Dingle; Aaron Dingle; Belle Dingle; Samson Dingle; Vinny Dingle

Sarah Sugden is a fictional character from the British ITV soap opera Emmerdale, played by Katie Hill since January 2017. She is the daughter of Andy Sugden (Kelvin Fletcher) and Debbie Dingle (Charley Webb) and has appeared since June 2005. Her storylines in the series have included her diagnosis of Fanconi anaemia, her subsequent health struggles following her diagnosis and being involved with drug dealer Danny Harrington (Louis Healy).

== Casting ==
Having been played by Sophia Amber Moore from toddler up to age 11 in 2016, the producers opted to recast the role in late 2016 to an older actress, Katie Hill, "due to the nature of the storyline of the character".

== Development ==
In 2018, "heartbreaking" and "traumatic" scenes involving Sarah getting a heart transplant aired. Scenes in July 2020 show Sarah breaking into Holdgate to find details on Johnny Woodfield's (Luca Hepworth) missing father. When Sarah's "rebellious side" and "surprising attitude" is explored, actress Hill voiced her excitement at the change in personality for her character. She stated that when she began portraying Sarah, she "was playing an innocent little girl who was fighting an illness", and that the material she was given was "quite emotional, heavy stuff". She stated that while she enjoyed the scenes and showing the sweet side to Sarah, she found it equally fun to explore a side of Sarah that has not yet been shown. She noted that this personality change is the Dingle aspect to her character. She defended the darker side of Sarah, explaining that her intentions are usually good. She also explained that long-term viewers will have seen Sarah grow up in hospital and should be able to understand her "spreading her wings" due to unlocking a "new sense of freedom that she's never had before". Hill opined that Sarah will continue with her bad behaviour, accrediting this to having Debbie and Charity as her female role models. She added that despite wanting to go down that route, she wants Sarah to keep a sweeter side alongside it, due to her history in hospital. She explained: "I think she will always have that to look back and turn to, because she knows what it's like to go through that kind of stuff at such a young age". After the story had concluded, Hill said that it was funny for Sarah to behave badly.

In July 2021, it was confirmed that Emmerdale would be revisiting Sarah's health. Hill was glad about the revisit since she enjoyed the initial heart transplant storyline and felt that it would be emotional to revisit the topic in years to come. The death of friend Leanna Cavanagh (Mimi Slinger) influences Sarah to think about her own life and how it could soon end like Leanna's. After she suddenly becomes ill, Sarah believes her "time is up" and that she is dying. She then sees Leanna's father Liam (Jonny McPherson) talking about Leanna and what he says affects Sarah, leaving her breathless and "consumed by utter fear" when she returns home. Her health scare leads her to contact the family of her heart donor.

== Storylines ==
When Sarah's mother, Debbie Dingle (Charley Webb), discovers she is pregnant at age fifteen, she conceals it and plans to leave the baby at the hospital after birth. Sarah is born in a shed with help from Daz Eden (Luke Tittensor) and is named Sarah Charity after her grandmothers Sarah Sugden (Alyson Spiro) and Charity Dingle (Emma Atkins). Debbie decides that she cannot raise a daughter and persuades Emily Kirk (Kate McGregor) to take Sarah when she leaves the village. Emily returns Sarah after Ethan Blake (Liam O'Brien) convinces her that Sarah should live with her father, Andy Sugden (Kelvin Fletcher). Debbie's step-grandmother, Lisa Dingle (Jane Cox), tries to get Debbie to bond with Sarah, but she refuses and suggests that Andy's ex-girlfriend, Jo Stiles (Roxanne Pallett), adopts Sarah; however, she does not sign the papers.

When Andy goes to prison, Sarah and Debbie start to bond. Upon his release, he starts abusing Jo and at nursery, Sarah bites another child, resulting in her suspension. Andy moves out, leaving Sarah in Jo's care but is permitted supervised access. When Jo leaves the villages, Sarah is reluctantly left with Debbie's family. Sarah and Debbie become closer, but she refuses to take custody. Sarah spends a night at Andy's house following the funeral of his father, Jack Sugden (Clive Hornby). Debbie and Andy fight for custody of Sarah, which is awarded to Debbie after Andy withdraws his application. Sarah begins to bruise and tire easily, worrying her parents, who believe someone is hurting her. After consulting a doctor, Sarah is diagnosed with Fanconi anemia (FA), which develops into leukemia. Sarah needs a bone marrow transplant and when a donor withdraws, her parents consider a saviour sibling. After being refused IVF, Debbie and Andy decide to conceive naturally, with the agreement of their partners. Sarah's brother, Jack Sugden (Seth Ball), is born and is a match for Sarah to have the transplant. A year later, Sarah is taken hostage by Debbie's serial killer ex-boyfriend, Cameron Murray (Dominic Power), but is saved by Andy and Moira Barton (Natalie J. Robb). Over two years later, Sarah leaves the village with Debbie and Jack.

A year later, Sarah, Debbie and Jack return to the village in a stolen car. Sarah and Jack are taken hostage by Debbie's bosses until she raises £50,000. Debbie reveals that Sarah has throat cancer and a fundraising page is set up to fund her proton beam therapy; an anonymous donation of £20,000 is made. Sarah finds a poorly Faith Dingle (Sally Dexter) in a barn, unaware she is Debbie's paternal grandmother. Faith collapses at the B&B and reveals that she made the donation. Sarah has treatment and recovers. Over a year later, she collapses with heart failure as a rare result of her chemotherapy. A matching heart is found but then discovered to be unfit. Emotionally and physically exhausted, Sarah questions whether a new heart would be worth the pain and hassle, and consequently refuses the transplant. After weeks of persuasion, she agrees to the transplant, which is successful. When Debbie moves to Scotland, Sarah asks to stay with Charity and her partner Vanessa Woodfield (Michelle Hardwick), which Debbie agrees to.

Sarah begins talking to Danny Harrington (Louis Healy) online and they meet when Sarah play truant. Charity and Vanessa warn Danny away, so Sarah explains that she meets him because she wants to enjoy herself in case she dies young from her illness. They agree to Sarah seeing Danny, but at a party, he gives her drugs. He convinces Sarah to sell drugs for him and claims that he will be beaten if he does not deliver, showing her injuries on his body. After learning the injury was from falling off his bike, Sarah realises that she was used and plants drugs in his pocket, before reporting him to the police. Danny is arrested and serves a jail sentence for at least a year in a youth detention facility; upon his release, he tries to rekindle their relationship but shows that he wants to use Sarah again for more drug transport instead of love.

== Reception ==
Hill received praise for her performances as a fearful Sarah Sugden awaiting an operation for a heart transplant. Viewers also praised the relationship between the actresses playing Sarah and her on-screen mother, Debbie. In 2021, Alice Penwill of Inside Soap wrote that due to viewers having watched over 15 years of Sarah's tribulations with her health, they had "become invested in her future". However, a year later, Leeds Live wrote that Sarah is not a popular character on Emmerdale. After scenes of Sarah debating on leaving the village aired, they found that "fans cannot wait to see the back of her" and were hoping that she would leave. However, the newspaper found that "not everyone was gunning for Sarah to leave the show", with some understanding her mindset since she is vulnerable with her illness. In 2022, Monde Mwitumwa from Leeds Live noted that Sarah "has already endured more trauma than most will in a lifetime" due being "in and out of hospital while battling a devastating diagnosis", and added that the character has been involved in many "intense scenes".
