= Jane Cox =

English actress

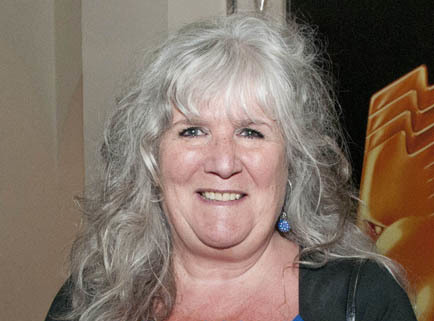
- Cox in 2013
- Born: 13 May 1952 (age 73); London, England
- Occupation: Actress
- Years active: 1980–present
- Known for: Allsorts (1991–1995); Emmerdale (1996–2020, 2024)

Jane Cox (born 13 May 1952) is an English actress, known for her role as Lisa Dingle in the ITV soap opera Emmerdale, a role she portrayed from 1996 to 2019 and again briefly in 2020 and in 2024. In 2011, she was nominated for the British Soap Award for Best Actress for her portrayal.

== Career ==
Cox has starred in episodes of Coronation Street, Hetty Wainthropp Investigates and The Bill. Her most notable pre-Emmerdale role was playing JJ in the children's entertainment series Allsorts from 1991 to 1995. She has also appeared on Lily Savage's Blankety Blank.

In March 2019, Cox announced that she would be leaving Emmerdale after 23 years of portraying Lisa Dingle. She made her final physical appearance on 24 May 2019, but made a voiceover appearance on 6 June 2019 in a farewell to her character. However, Cox briefly reprised the role for several voice cameos over the course of October and November 2020.

== Filmography ==
Year	Title	Role	Notes
1981	My Father's House	Sister	Series 1: Episode 1
1981	The Spoils of War	Nurse	Episode: "Winter Wedding"
1986, 1988	The Return of the Antelope	Ethel the Cook	7 episodes
1986	The Monocled Mutineer	Unnamed	Episode: "A Dead Man on Leave"
1987	Bulman	Diana White	Episode: "Death by Misadventure"
1988	Testimony: The Story of Shostakovich	The Widow	Film
1991	Coronation Street	Mrs. Shaw	3 episodes
1991–1995	Allsorts	JJ	Series regular
1994	Brookside	Counsellor	1 episode
1994	The Bill	Mrs. Cattini	Episode: "Licensed to Kill"
1995	The Governor	Sarah Smith	Series 1: Episode 2
1995	The Ghostbusters of East Finchley	Brenda	6 episodes
1996	Hetty Wainthrop Investigates	Aileen	Episode: "A High Profile"
1996–2020, 2024	Emmerdale	Lisa Dingle	Series regular; 2,601 episodes
1997	Emmerdale: The Dingles Down Under	Lisa Dingle	Direct-to-video; Emmerdale spin-off film
2001	Lily Savage's Blankety Blank	Herself	Series 15: Episode 17
2010	Emmerdale: The Dingles For Richer for Poorer	Lisa Dingle	Direct-to-video; Emmerdale spin-off film
2011	Mrs Peppercorn's Magical Reading Room	Mrs. Libby	Short film

== Awards and nominations ==
Year	Award	Category	Result	Ref.
2005	The British Soap Awards	Best Actress	Nominated	
2011	The British Soap Awards	Best Actress	Shortlisted	
2011	TV Choice Awards	Best Soap Actress	Nominated	
2011	Inside Soap Awards	Best Actress	Nominated	
2019	Inside Soap Awards	Best Exit	Won	
