= Mrs Peppercorn's Magical Reading Room =

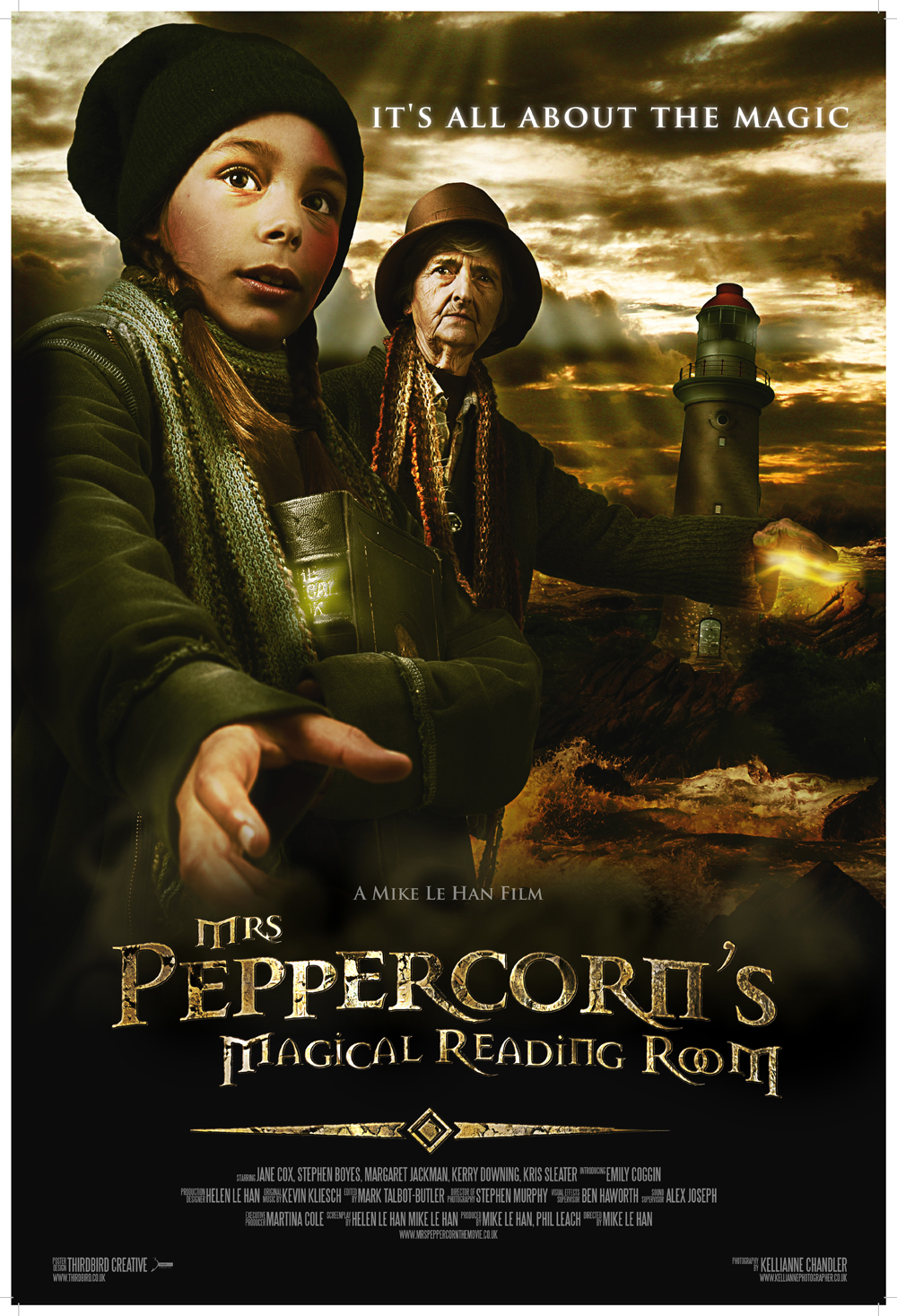
- Directed by: Mike Lè Han
- Written by: Helen Lè Han and Mike Lè Han
- Produced by: Mike Lè Han
- Starring: Jane Cox; Stephen Boyes; Margaret Jackman; Kerry Downing; Kris Sleater and introducing Emily Coggin
- Narrated by: Penny Ryder
- Cinematography: Stephen Murphy (DOP)
- Edited by: Mark Talbot-Butler
- Music by: Kevin Kliesch
- Release date: March 2011
- Running time: 24 Minutes
- Language: English

Mrs Peppercorn's Magical Reading Room is a 24-minute fantasy/magical short film directed by Mike Lè Han. In November 2010, the official trailer was released and entered into the International Movie Trailer Festival and won Best Trailer for an Un-Produced Movie. In March 2011, the film premiered at Bafta in London, then in August of the same year, was requested by Walt Disney Animation Studios to screen at their Burbank facility in Los Angeles. Three days later, the film won grand prize of Best Short Film at the prestigious HollyShorts International Film Festival. In December 2011, it won Best Short Fiction Film at the Olypmia International Film Festival in Greece.

In May 2013, Variety reported that a teen fantasy film loosely based on the short film, titled The Peppercorn Chronicles, was in development, with Lè Han directing the film and co-writing the script with his wife Helen. The film was to be produced by Martina Cole’s production company Black Lake, with Cole serving as executive producer, and production was expected to begin in February 2014 in the United States and Hungary. Jodelle Ferland, Noah Ringer and Michael Eklund were signed on to star in the film, which was intended to be the first film in the Peppercorn trilogy. As of May 2025, none of these films ever materialized.

== Awards ==
Year	Festival	Title	Award	Result
2010	International Movie Trailer Festival	Trailer for Mrs Peppercorn	Best trailer for an un-produced movie	Winner
2011	HollyShorts Film Festival	Mrs Peppercorn's Magical Reading Room	Best short film	Winner
2011	Olympia International Film Festival - Greece	Mrs Peppercorn's Magical Reading Room	Best Short Fiction Film - Children's Jury Award	Winner
