= Katie Hill (actress) =

English actress (born 2003)

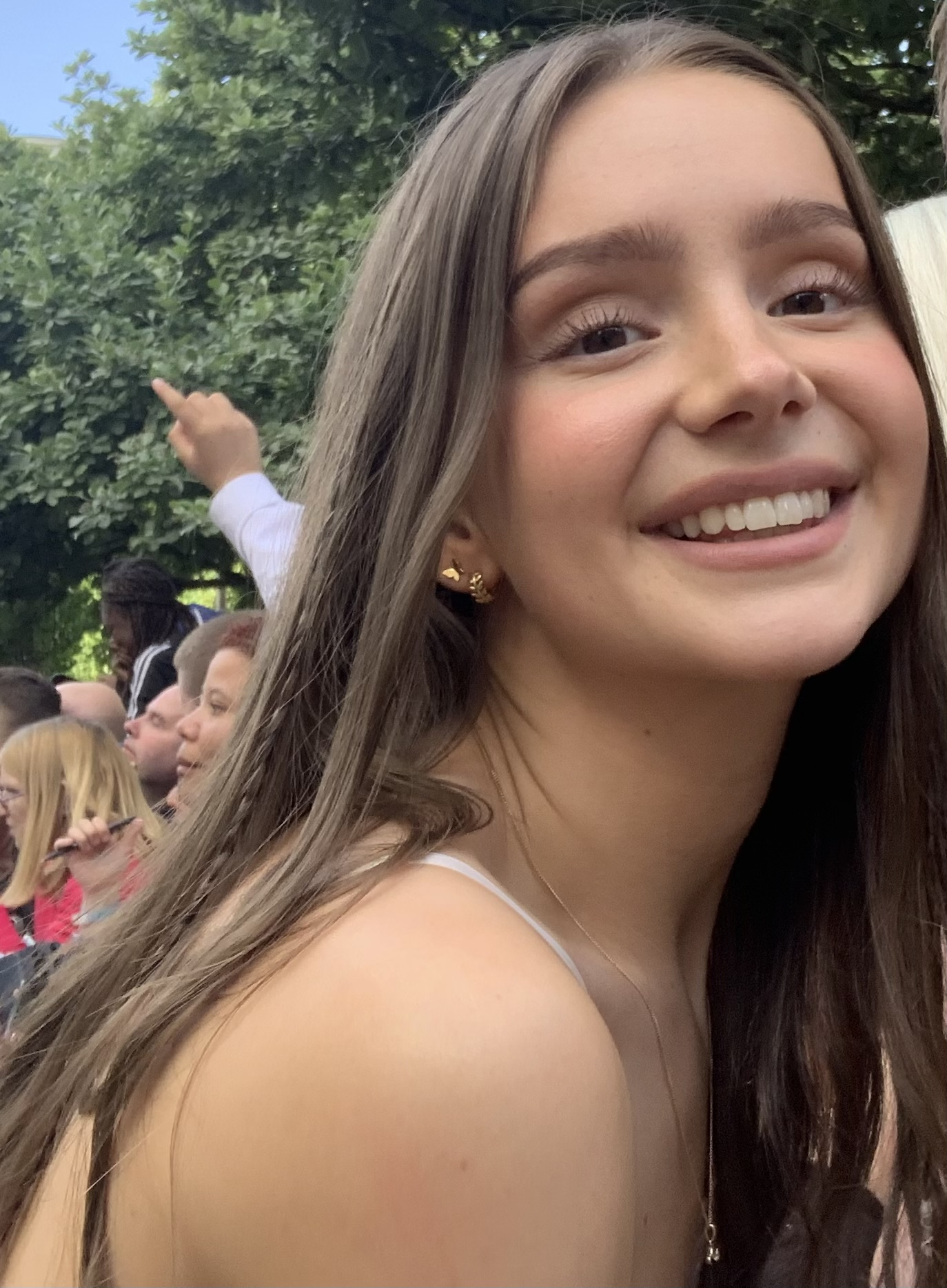
- Hill in 2022
- Born: 8 March 2003 (age 23); Leeds, West Yorkshire, England
- Occupations: Actress; singer
- Years active: 2017–present

Katie Hill (born 8 March 2003) is an English actress and singer. She became the fifth actress to take over the role of Sarah Sugden in the ITV1 soap opera Emmerdale in 2017, a role she has portrayed since.

== Life and career ==
Katie Hill was born on 8 March 2003 in Leeds, West Yorkshire. She studied performing at SCALA, beginning her acting career on stage, with roles including Maggie in Scrooge: The Musical, Florence in Cameron Mackintosh's Oliver! and Little Cosette in Les Misérables. In 2017, she became the fifth actress to be cast in the role of Sarah Sugden in the ITV1 soap opera Emmerdale. It was confirmed that they needed an older actress due to the character taking on a mature storyline topic. It transpired that the story arc was to involve Hill's character going through Fanconi anemia, needing a bone marrow transplant and becoming involved with a drug dealer. Hill enjoyed being introduced with a topical storyline and hoped that she raised awareness.

In 2020, Hill was featured on Emmerdale's YouTube channel, covering "Almost is Never Enough" by Ariana Grande and Nathan Sykes. Viewers were surprised by her singing abilities, with the Metro's Stephen Patterson describing it as a "wonderful rendition". She then began posting various covers on Instagram. In 2023, she announced that she had begun writing music that she hoped to release, but confirmed she would continue acting. In 2024, she released her debut single, "Bitter Sweet".

== Filmography ==
Year	Title	Role	Notes
2017–present	Emmerdale	Sarah Sugden	Regular role
2017	This Morning	Herself	Guest appearance

== Stage ==
- Scrooge: The Musical
- Oliver!
- Les Misérables

== Discography ==
=== Singles ===
List of singles, showing year released and album name
Title	Year	Album
"Bitter Sweet"	2024	TBA
