= Mike Lè Han =

English filmmaker

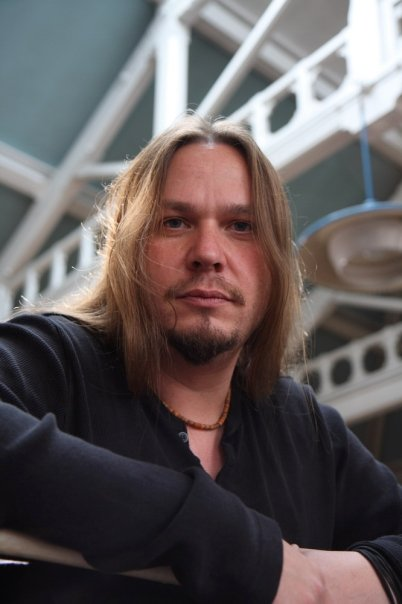
- Le Han on set 2009.
- Born: Mike Lè Han
- Occupations: Film director, Screenwriter, Visual Effects Artist
- Years active: 1997–present

Mike Lè Han is an English screenwriter, film director and property developer who has worked in television and on feature films. He has a background in post-production and visual effects. He lives in Los Angeles, California.

== Career ==
Lè Han directed many outside broadcast, drama and docudrama productions between 1997 and 2009. His work was nominated for two RTS Awards in 2009 when he directed The Great Train Robbery and Crimes That Shook Britain for Manchester-based production company Title Role. Le Han has also directed several commercials for varying car manufacturers.

In 2010, Lè Han co-wrote with wife Helen Lè Han Mrs Peppercorn's Magical Reading Room and completed filming in May of the same year. The trailer for the film won Best Trailer for an un-produced movie at the International Movie Trailer Festival in Los Angeles. The finished short with crime-novelist Martina Cole functioning as executive producer premiered March 2011 to an invite-only audience at BAFTA in London and is being reworked into a feature.

In January 2011, Lè Han was featured as a director to watch in MovieScope Magazine and then in the April edition of Variety in the UK and USA.

In August 2011 Mrs Peppercorn's Magical Reading Room won Best Short Film by unanimous vote at the prestigious HollyShorts Film Festival in Los Angeles. In the same month at the request of Disney Animation Studios, he screened the film to executives and creatives at their Burbank facilities. In December 2011 it won Best Short Fiction Film at the Olympia International Film Festival in Greece.

On Halloween Lè Han released online a trailer to accompany a pitch to reboot the Hellraiser franchise. The video went viral.

Mike also owns and runs US based Royal Park Construction a property development company based out of Los Angeles, but operates on both the west and east coast of the United States.

== Awards ==
Year	Festival	Title	Award	Result
2009	Royal Television Society	The Great Train Robbery	RTS	Nominated
2009	Royal Television Society	Crimes That Shook Britain	RTS	Nominated
2010	International Movie Trailer Festival	Trailer for Mrs Peppercorn	Best trailer for an un-produced movie	Winner
2011	HollyShorts Film Festival	Mrs Peppercorn's Magical Reading Room	Best short film	Winner
2011	Olympia International Film Festival – Greece	Mrs Peppercorn's Magical Reading Room	Best Short Fiction Film – Children's Jury Award	Winner

== Filmography ==
Director Credits

Year	Title	Details	Broadcast
1997	Life – Short Film	Completed	Film Festivals
1999	Depart – Short Film	Completed	Film Festivals
2000	Walkabout	Completed	Film Festivals
2000	York	Completed	ITV
2002	Beyond the Blade	Completed	ITV
2003	Cook's Last Voyage	Completed	ITV
2003	Beyond The Moors Murders	Completed	ITV
2004	Hawk Speed	Completed	ITV4
2007	Fast Bikes Magazine DVD	Completed	DVD
2007	Black	Pre-production	TBC
2008	Shipman	Completed	The History Channel
2008	Stephanie Slater	Completed	The History Channel
2008	The Russell Murders	Completed	The History Channel
2008	Beverley Allitt	Completed	The History Channel
2008	Sarah Payne	Completed	The History Channel
2009	The Great Train Robbery	Completed	The History Channel
2009	The Brinks Mat Heist	Completed	The History Channel
2009	Security Express Heist	Completed	The History Channel
2009	Millennium Dome Diamond Heist	Completed	The History Channel
2009	Tunbridge Securitas Heist	Completed	The History Channel
2010	Britain's Biggest Heists	Completed	Crime & Investigation Network
2011	Mrs Peppercorn's Magical Reading Room	Completed	Worldwide film festivals
2013	Hellraiser: Origins	Completed	Pitch to reboot the franchise
2015	Adore Me	Commercial	

Second Unit Director

Year	Title	Details	Broadcast
2008	Martina Cole's 'Lady Killers'	Completed	ITV 3

Producer Credits

Year	Title
2000	York
2001	Expedition Global Eagle
2002	Beyond The Blade
2003	Cook's Last Voyage
2003	Beyond The Moors Murders
2004	Hawk Speed

Writer Credits

Year	Title	Type
1997	Life	Short Film
1999	Depart	Short Film
2000	Walkabout	Short Film
2000	York	TV
2002	Beyond the Blade	TV
2003	Cook's Last Voyage	TV
2003	Beyond The Moors Murders	TV
2004	Hawk Speed	TV
2004	VIMM City	TV
2005	Case of the Green Wallpaper	TV
2006	Sapien	Short Film
2007	Black	Short Film
2007	Best Day's	Short Film
2008	Black Shallow Creek	Short Film
2011	Mrs Peppercorn's Magical Reading Room	Short Film
2012	The Peppercorn Chronicles	Feature Trilogy
2013	The Surge	Feature Film
2014	ARK	Feature Film
2014	TITAN	Feature Film
