= Takuya Kirimoto =

Japanese actor (born 1967)

- 桐本 拓哉
- Born: July 27, 1967 (age 59); Gifu Prefecture, Japan
- Education: Meijo University
- Occupations: Actor; voice actor
- Years active: 1990–present
- Agent: Aoni Production
- Height: 172 cm (5 ft 8 in)

Takuya Kirimoto (桐本 拓哉, Kirimoto Takuya; born July 27, 1967) is a Japanese actor and voice actor from Gifu Prefecture, Japan. He is attached to Aoni Production. He is the official dubbing actor for Bradley Cooper, Hyun Bin, So Ji-sub and many more.

== Filmography ==
=== Television animation ===
- Turn A Gundam (1999), Yanny Oviess
- Kirby: Right Back at Ya! (2001), Biggy
- Naruto (2003), Yoroi Akado
- Bleach (2004), Saito Eikichiro
- Eyeshield 21 (2005), Agon Kongo
- Yakitate!! Japan (2005), Spencer Henry Hokou
- Saru Get You -On Air- (2006), Pipotron Kuratsuku
- Darker than Black (2007), Amagiri
- Death Note (2007), Aiber
- Kamisama Dolls (2011), Kyousuke Karahari
- Naruto: Shippuden (2011), Sadai
- Eureka Seven: AO (2012), Gazelle
- Sword Art Online (2012), Sigurd
- Sasami-san@Ganbaranai (2013), Susano'o
- JoJo's Bizarre Adventure: Stardust Crusaders (2014), J. Geil
- Marvel Disk Wars: The Avengers (2014), Sabretooth
- World Trigger (2014), Masamune Kido
- Gangsta. (2015), Ivan Glazyev
- Pretty Guardian Sailor Moon Crystal (2016), Dr. Tomoe
- Naruto: Shippuden (2016), En Oyashiro
- Chaos;Child (2017), Takeshi Shinjō
- Kado: The Right Answer (2017), Takumi Gonno
- One Piece (2017), Charlotte Cracker
- Overlord II (2018), Elias Brandt Dale Raeven
- Zoids Wild (2018), Ikazuchi
- Fairy Tail (2019), Belserion
- Black Rock Shooter: Dawn Fall (2022), Colonel [David]
- Technoroid Overmind (2023), Hakushū Shibaura
- The Apothecary Diaries (2024), Lakan
- Grendizer U (2024), Genzō Umon
- The Apothecary Diaries Season 2 (2025), Lakan

=== Theatrical animation ===
- Summer Wars (2009), Riichi Jinnouchi
- You Are Umasou (2010), Gonza
- Saint Seiya: Legend of Sanctuary (2014), Pisces Aphrodite
- City Hunter the Movie: Shinjuku Private Eyes (2019)

=== Original video animation (OVA) ===
- Yukikaze (2002), Richard Burgadish
- Freedom (2006), Taira
- Fist of the North Star: Legend of Yuria (2007), Shin

=== Video games ===
- Ace Combat Zero: The Belkan War (2006), Larry Foulke
- Armored Core: Last Raven (2006), Evangel
- Dynasty Warriors and Warriors Orochi series (2007), Zhuge Dan
- Ryū ga Gotoku 3 (2009), Wakazo
- Trinity: Souls of Zill O'll (2010), Areus
- Ryū ga Gotoku 5 (2012), Seiji Kousaka
- OZMAFIA!! (2013), Caesar
- JoJo's Bizarre Adventure: All-Star Battle (2013), Whitesnake/C-Moon
- JoJo's Bizarre Adventure: Eyes of Heaven (2015), J. Geil
- Super Robot Wars V (2017), Soji Murakumo
- Super Smash Bros. Ultimate (2018), Mii Fighter Type 9
- Fate/Grand Order (2020), Odysseus
- Judgment (video game) (2018), Masamichi Shintani
- JoJo's Bizarre Adventure: All-Star Battle R (2022), Hanged Man
- Fitness Boxing Fist of the North Star (2022), Shin
- One Piece Bounty Rush (2018), Charlotte Cracker

=== Tokusatsu ===
- Tokumei Sentai Go-Busters Returns vs. Dōbutsu Sentai Go-Busters (2013), Great Demon Lord Azazel
- Ressha Sentai ToQger (2014), Keeper Bishop
- Kamen Rider Ghost (2014), Ono Ganma

=== Dubbing ===
==== Live-action ====
- Bradley Cooper
  - The Hangover (Phil Wenneck)
  - The Hangover Part II (Phil Wenneck)
  - Silver Linings Playbook (Patrick "Pat" Solitano Jr.)
  - American Hustle (FBI Agent Richard "Richie" DiMaso)
  - The Hangover Part III (Phil Wenneck)
  - The Place Beyond the Pines (Avery Cross)
  - American Sniper (Chris Kyle)
  - Serena (George Pemberton)
  - Limitless (Eddie Morra)
  - Joy (Neil Walker)
  - War Dogs (Henry Girard)
  - A Star Is Born (Jackson "Jack" Maine)
  - The Mule (Colin Bates)
  - IF (Ice)
- Hyun Bin
  - Daddy-Long-Legs (guy in flashbacks)
  - My Lovely Sam Soon (Hyun Jin-heon)
  - A Millionaire's First Love (Kang Jae-Kyung)
  - The Snow Queen (Han Tae Woong / Han Deuk Gu)
  - Secret Garden (Kim Joo-won)
  - The Fatal Encounter (King Jeongjo)
  - Confidential Assignment (Im Cheol-ryung)
  - Rampant (Lee Chung)
- Ben Foster
  - 30 Days of Night (The Stranger)
  - 3:10 to Yuma (Charlie Prince)
  - Contraband (Sebastian Abney)
  - Ain't Them Bodies Saints (Patrick Wheeler)
  - Warcraft (Medivh)
- So Ji-sub
  - I'm Sorry, I Love You (Cha Moo-hyuk)
  - Cain and Abel (Lee Cho-in / Oh Kang-ho)
  - Road No. 1 (Lee Jang-woo)
- 300 (Stelios (Michael Fassbender))
- Alatriste (Conde de Guadalmedina (Eduardo Noriega))
- Apollo 13 (2003 Fuji TV edition) (Seymour Liebergot (Clint Howard))
- Apt Pupil (Todd Bowden (Brad Renfro))
- The Art of Racing in the Rain (Denny Swift (Milo Ventimiglia))
- Barton Fink (DVD edition) (Barton Fink (John Turturro))
- Bedazzled (Daniel (Orlando Jones))
- Big Little Lies (Perry Wright (Alexander Skarsgård))
- Biker Boyz (Kid (Derek Luke))
- Blade 2 (2005 TV Tokyo edition) (Snowman (Donnie Yen))
- Blade: Trinity (2007 TV Tokyo edition) (Hannibal King (Ryan Reynolds))
- Blade Runner 2049 (Niander Wallace (Jared Leto))
- The Box (Arthur Lewis (James Marsden))
- Bram Stoker's Dracula (15th Anniversary Blu-Ray edition) (Dr. Jack Seward (Richard E. Grant))
- The Butler (Richard Nixon (John Cusack))
- Capote (Perry Smith (Clifton Collins Jr.))
- Cellular (Ryan Hewitt (Chris Evans))
- Charlie Bartlett (Nathan Gardner (Robert Downey Jr.))
- The Cloverfield Paradox (Gordon Mundy (Chris O'Dowd))
- The Crown (John F. Kennedy (Michael C. Hall))
- Cube Zero (Eric Wynn (Zachary Bennett))
- The Da Vinci Code (2009 Fuji TV edition) (Youth on Bus (Shane Zaza))
- Das Boot (2004 TV Tokyo edition) (Fähnrich Ullmann (Martin May))
- Deadly Impact (Ryan Alba (Greg Serano))
- Desperate Housewives (Lee McDermott (Kevin Rahm))
- The Detonator (2009 TV Tokyo edition) (Dimitru Ilinca (Matthew Leitch))
- The Devil Inside (Father Ben Rawlings (Simon Quarterman))
- Dexter (Dexter Morgan (Michael C. Hall))
- Dirty Sexy Money (Nick George (Peter Krause))
- Doctor Sleep (Crow Daddy (Zahn McClarnon))
- Driven to Kill (Stephan Abramov (Dmitry Chepovetsky))
- The Dukes of Hazzard (Bo Duke (Seann William Scott))
- Enemy of the State (2003 Fuji TV edition) (Selby (Seth Green))
- The English Patient (Netflix edition) (Caravaggio (Willem Dafoe))
- ER (Dr. Dave Malucci (Erik Palladino))
- Falling Skies (season 3 onwards) (John Pope (Colin Cunningham))
- The Fast and the Furious (2005 TV Asahi edition) (Leon (Johnny Strong))
- The Final Girls (Kurt (Adam DeVine))
- Fireproof (Caleb Holt (Kirk Cameron))
- Flags of Our Fathers (Sergeant Michael Strank (Barry Pepper))
- The Forever Purge (Dylan Tucker (Josh Lucas))
- Four Brothers (Bobby Mercer (Mark Wahlberg))
- Freedom Writers (Scott Casey (Patrick Dempsey))
- Game of Thrones (Jaime Lannister (Nikolaj Coster-Waldau))
- Goal! (Gavin Harris (Alessandro Nivola))
- The Godfather (2008 Blu-Ray edition) (Carlo Rizzi (Gianni Russo))
- Gone in 60 Seconds (2004 NTV edition) (Kip (Giovanni Ribisi))
- Gorgeous (Pioneer LDC edition) (Long Yi (Richie Jen))
- Gun Shy (Fidel Vaillar (José Zúñiga))
- Gutshot Straight (Jack (George Eads))
- Hansel & Gretel: Witch Hunters (Hansel (Jeremy Renner))
- Hardball (Ticky Tobin (John Hawkes))
- Harry Potter and the Goblet of Fire (Barty Crouch Jr (David Tennant))
- Hercules (King Eurystheus (Joseph Fiennes))
- Heroes (Adam Monroe/Takezo Kensei (David Anders))
- Horrible Bosses (Nick Hendricks (Jason Bateman))
- Horrible Bosses 2 (Nick Hendricks (Jason Bateman))
- House of Gucci (Paolo Gucci (Jared Leto))
- The Hungover Games (Bradley (Ross Nathan))
- The Hunted (2008 TV Tokyo edition) (Bobby Moret (José Zúñiga))
- The Ice Harvest (Charlie Arglist (John Cusack))
- Idle Hands (Mick (Seth Green))
- The Invention of Lying (Brad Kessler (Rob Lowe))
- Iron Man 3 (Eric Savin (James Badge Dale))
- iZombie (Blaine "DeBeers" McDonough (David Anders))
- Jay and Silent Bob Strike Back (Chaka Luther King (Chris Rock))
- Jojo Rabbit (Captain Klenzendorf (Sam Rockwell))
- Jurassic Park III (Mark Degler (Taylor Nichols))
- Kate & Leopold (Charlie McKay (Breckin Meyer))
- Kill Your Darlings (David Kammerer (Michael C. Hall))
- King Arthur: Legend of the Sword (Vortigern (Jude Law))
- Life (Sho Murakami (Hiroyuki Sanada))
- Life or Something Like It (Pete Scanlon (Edward Burns))
- Mama (Luke Desange, Jeffrey Desange (Nikolaj Coster-Waldau))
- A Man Apart (DEA Agent Demetrius Hicks (Larenz Tate))
- Man on a Ledge (Michael "Mike" Ackerman (Anthony Mackie))
- Man on the Moon (Bob Zmuda (Paul Giamatti))
- Mercenary for Justice (Dresham (Luke Goss))
- Michel Vaillant (Steve Warson (Peter Youngblood Hills))
- Midway (Wade McClusky (Luke Evans))
- Million Dollar Baby (2006 TV Tokyo edition) (Shawrelle Berry (Anthony Mackie))
- Mindhunters (Rafe Perry (Will Kemp))
- Miss Congeniality (2005 NTV edition) (Eric Matthews (Benjamin Bratt))
- Mission: Impossible III (Director Musgrave (Billy Crudup))
- Mother, May I Sleep with Danger? (Play Director (James Franco))
- Murder by Numbers (Richard Haywood (Ryan Gosling))
- Nancy Drew and the Hidden Staircase (Carson Drew (Sam Trammell))
- New Year's Eve (Sam Ahern Jr (Josh Duhamel))
- Ocean's Eleven (2005 Fuji TV edition) (Linus Caldwell (Matt Damon))
- Ocean's Twelve (2007 NTV edition) (Linus Caldwell (Matt Damon))
- Ocean's Thirteen (2010 Fuji TV edition) (Linus Caldwell (Matt Damon))
- On Becoming a God in Central Florida (Travis Stubbs (Alexander Skarsgård))
- Once (Guy (Glen Hansard))
- Passengers (Eric Clark (Patrick Wilson))
- Paul, Apostle of Christ (Mauritius (Olivier Martinez))
- Pearl Harbor (2004 TV Asahi edition) (First Lieutenant Rafe McCawley (Ben Affleck))
- Perry Mason (Perry Mason (Matthew Rhys))
- The Physician (Shah Ala ad-Daula (Olivier Martinez))
- Playing by Heart (Keenan (Ryan Phillippe))
- Pretty in Pink (Philip F. "Duckie" Dale (Jon Cryer))
- The Program (David Walsh (Chris O'Dowd))
- Red Lights (Thomas "Tom" Buckley (Cillian Murphy))
- The Revenant (John Fitzgerald (Tom Hardy))
- Rogue One (Bodhi Rook (Riz Ahmed))
- Safe Haven (Detective Kevin Tierney (David Lyons))
- Sahara (Al Giordino (Steve Zahn))
- Saw 3D (Gibson (Chad Donella))
- The Scorpion King (2006 NTV edition) (Takmet (Peter Facinelli))
- Serenity (Malcolm Reynolds (Nathan Fillion))
- Six Feet Under (Nate Fisher (Peter Krause))
- Skyline (Jarrod (Eric Balfour))
- So Close (2006 TV Tokyo edition) (Ma Siu-ma)
- Sophie Scholl – The Final Days (Hans Fritz Scholl (Fabian Hinrichs))
- Spectre (C (Andrew Scott))
- The Spiderwick Chronicles (Richard Grace (Andrew McCarthy))
- The Stand (Randall Flagg / "The Dark Man" (Alexander Skarsgård))
- Strike (D.I. Eric Wardle (Killian Scott))
- Stuart Little (2002 TV Asahi edition) (Monty (Steve Zahn))
- Suits (Harvey Reginald Specter (Gabriel Macht))
- T2 Trainspotting (Francis "Franco" Begbie (Robert Carlyle))
- Taxi (Detective Andrew Washburn (Jimmy Fallon))
- Titanic (2001 Fuji TV edition) (Harold Bride (Craig Kelly))
- Top Gun (2005 NTV edition) (LT Tom "Iceman" Kazansky (Val Kilmer))
- Transformers (Colonel Sharp (Glenn Morshower))
- Tron: Legacy (Castor (Michael Sheen))
- Tropic Thunder (Kirk Lazarus (Robert Downey Jr.))
- The Vampire Diaries (Damon Salvatore (Ian Somerhalder))
- The Veil (Nick (Reid Scott))
- Venom (Dan Lewis (Reid Scott))
- Venom: Let There Be Carnage (Dan Lewis (Reid Scott))
- Vertical Limit (2003 TV Asahi edition) (Peter Garrett (Chris O'Donnell))
- The Village (2008 NTV edition) (Noah Percy (Adrien Brody))
- The West Wing (William Bailey (Joshua Malina))
- When the Bough Breaks (Mike Mitchell (Theo Rossi))
- Where Hope Grows (Calvin Campbell (Kristoffer Polaha))
- Windtalkers (2005 TV Asahi edition) (Private Andrew Harrigan (Brian Van Holt))
- XXX: State of the Union (2009 TV Asahi edition) (Agent Kyle Steele (Scott Speedman))

==== Animated ====
- Kung Fu Panda (Master Mantis)
- Kung Fu Panda 2 (Master Mantis)
- Kung Fu Panda 3 (Master Mantis)
- Moomins on the Riviera (White Shadow)
- Rango (Ezekiel)
- Return to Never Land (Edward)
- Star Wars: Droids (2005 DVD edition) (Jann Tosh)
