= Yasuyuki Kase =

Japanese voice actor (born 1971)

- Born: March 14, 1971 (age 55); Ōta, Tokyo, Japan
- Occupation: Voice actor
- Years active: 1995–present
- Notable credit: Naruto as Kankuro

Yasuyuki Kase (加瀬 康之, Kase Yasuyuki; born March 14, 1971) is a Japanese voice actor. He is best known for Japanese dubbing roles for Ryan Reynolds and Paul Bettany.

== Filmography ==
=== Television animation ===
2002

- Secret of Cerulean Sand (Kera Colorage)

2003

- Battle Vixens (Genka Kada)
- Bobobo-bo Bo-bobo (Megafan)
- Naruto (Kankuro)

2004

- Destiny of the Shrine Maiden (Girochi)
- Diamond Daydreams (Jurota Tokibi)
- Mermaid Melody Pichi Pichi Pitch (Kashiwagi)
- Mezzo DSA (Leon)

2005

- Absolute Boy (Takuma Kaburaki)
- Kyo Kara Maoh! (Christel)

2006

- Air Gear (Fumei Goshogawara)

2007

- Darker Than Black (Louis)
- Naruto: Shippuden (Kankuro)
- Bleach (Ashido Kano)
- Neuro: Supernatural Detective (Tōko Eishiya, Yasuji Meguri)

2008

- Inazuma Eleven series (Ryugo Someoka, Kazumichi Banjō, Dante Diablo, Takanori Kujirai, Mack Scride, Reo Goryū, Ganjirō Seki)
- Hell Girl: Three Vessels (Seiji Yamaoka)
- Rosario + Vampire series (Okuto Kotsubo)
- Soul Eater (Eibon)
- Strike Witches (Kurt Flachfeld)
- Yozakura Quartet series (Shidō Mizuki)
- Sands of Destruction (Jade)
- One Outs (Jack, Yamakawa, Kinouchi, Sawamura)

2009

- Fullmetal Alchemist: Brotherhood (Henry Douglas)
- Tamagotchi! (Spacytchi)

2010

- Fairy Tail (Simon, Dan Straight)
- Rainbow: Nisha Rokubō no Shichinin (Yokoyama)

2012

- Sankarea: Undying Love (Danichiro Sanka (young))

2015

- Durarara!!x2 (Mikiya Awakusu)
- Subete ga F ni Naru (Sōhei Saikawa)

2016

- Descending Stories: Showa Genroku Rakugo Shinju (Yakuza Boss)
- 91 Days (Serpente)
- JoJo's Bizarre Adventure: Diamond Is Unbreakable (Mikitaka Hazekura)

2017

- Chain Chronicle ~Light of Haecceitas~ (Silva)
- Attack on Titan (Gelgar)

2018

- One Piece (Morgans)
- Boruto: Naruto Next Generations (Kankuro)

2020

- Pet (Hayashi)

2021

- The Promised Neverland Season 2 (William Minerva)

2022

- Spy × Family (SSS Lieutenant)
- Golden Kamuy 4th Season (Waichirō Sekiya)
- Cyberpunk: Edgerunners (Falco))
- To Your Eternity Season 2 (Kai Renald Rawle)

2023

- Masamune-kun's Revenge R (Frank Besson)
- Oshi no Ko (Taishi Gotanda)

2024

- Mission: Yozakura Family (Seiji Hotokeyama)

2025

- Me and the Alien MuMu (Decimaru)
- Miru: Paths to My Future (Mario's father)
- Detectives These Days Are Crazy! (Sōya Mimasaka)
- Sakamoto Days (Son Hee)

2026

- The Elusive Samurai (Uesugi Noriaki)
- Cardfight!! Vanguard: Link Joker Hen (Eru Nakagami)
- Code Geass (Kewell Soresi, Yoshitaka Minami, Claudio S. Darlton)
- Code Geass R2 (Yoshitaka Minami, Claudio S. Darlton)
- D.Gray-Man (Lenny)
- Gungrave (Jolice)
- Gunparade March (Junichi Tajima)
- Initial D: Fifth Stage (Eiji Kubo)
- Iron Man (Cancer)
- Marvel Disk Wars: The Avengers (Thor Odinson/Thor, J.A.R.V.I.S.)
- Mobile Suit Gundam 00 (Emilio Ribisi)
- Rocket Girls (Norman Randolph)
- Shigurui (Masazumi Honda)
- Squid Girl (Narrator)
- Tokyo Majin (Kureha Mibu)
- Transformers: Cybertron (Tera Shaver, Red Alert)
- Trouble Chocolate (Truffle)
- Uninhabited Planet Survive! (Farlow)
- Zatch Bell! (Maestro)

=== Original video animation ===
- Street Fighter Alpha: Generations (2005) (Ryu)
- Iron Man: Rise of Technovore (2013) (J.A.R.V.I.S.)
- Thus Spoke Kishibe Rohan (2018) (Mikitaka Hazekura)
- Code Geass: Rozé of the Recapture (2024) (Walter)
- Fullmetal Alchemist: Brotherhood (????) (Heathcliff Arb)
- Halo Legends (????) (Ralph)
- Yozakura Quartet ~Tsuki ni Naku~ (????) (Shidō Mizuki)

=== Original net animation ===
- Hero Mask (2018–19) (James Blood)
- Cyberpunk: Edgerunners (2022) (Falco)
- Time Patrol Bon (2024) (Gayler)

=== Theatrical animation ===
- Appleseed: Ex Machina (2007) (Yoshitsune Miyamoto)
- Ghost in the Shell: The New Movie (2015) (Administrator of Protective Institution)
- Inazuma Eleven GO vs. Danbōru Senki W (2012) (Ryugo Someoka)
- Inazuma Eleven: Saikyō Gundan Ōga Shūrai (2010) (Ryugo Someoka)
- Legend of the Millennium Dragon (2011) (Sadaharu Usui)
- Naruto the Movie: Legend of the Stone of Gelel (2005) (Kankuro)
- Naruto Shippuden the Movie: The Will of Fire (2009) (Kankuro)
- Tales of Vesperia: The First Strike (2009) (Yurgis)

=== Video games ===
- Way of the Samurai(2002) (Kenji)
- Super Robot Wars Alpha 3 (2005) (Touma Kanou)
- Final Fantasy XII (2006) (Prince Rasler Heios Nabradia)
- Final Fantasy XIII (2009) (Rygdea)
- JoJo's Bizarre Adventure: All Star Battle (2013) (Funny Valentine)
- Granblue Fantasy (2014) (Edgedweller, Joy, Maleagant)
- Initial D Arcade Stage (2002—2014) (Eiji Kubo)
- Bravely Second (2015) (Jean Engarde)
- JoJo's Bizarre Adventure: Eyes of Heaven (2015) (Funny Valentine)
- Nioh (2017) (Saika Magoichi)
- Xenoblade Chronicles 2 (2017) (Poppibuster/Hanabuster)
- Xenoblade Chronicles 2: Torna – The Golden Country (2018) (Zettar)
- Fate/Grand Order (2018) (Sakamoto Ryōma)
- Granblue Fantasy (2019) (Joy)
- Nioh 2 (2020) (Saika Magoichi)
- Final Fantasy VII Remake (2020) (Johnny)
- Tales of Arise (2021) (Dohalim)
- Fortnite (2021) (Guy)(Japanese server)
- JoJo's Bizarre Adventure: All Star Battle R (2022) (Funny Valentine)
- Armored Core VI: Fires of Rubicon (2023) (V.IV Rusty)
- Granblue Fantasy (2023) (Maleagant)
- Final Fantasy VII Rebirth (2024) (Johnny)
- Death Stranding 2: On the Beach (2025) (Neil Vana)

=== Drama CD ===
- Final Fantasy Tactics Advance (????) (Cid Randell)

=== Dubbing ===
==== Live-action ====
- Ryan Reynolds
  - X-Men Origins: Wolverine (Wade Wilson)
  - Safe House (2018 BS Japan edition) (Matt Weston)
  - Deadpool (Wade Wilson/Deadpool)
  - Life (Rory Adams)
  - Deadpool 2 (Wade Wilson/Deadpool)
  - Hobbs & Shaw (Locke)
  - 6 Underground (One)
  - Free Guy (Guy)
  - Red Notice (Nolan Booth)
  - Hitman's Wife's Bodyguard (Michael Bryce)
  - The Adam Project (Older Adam Reed)
  - Ghosted (Jonas)
  - IF (Cal)
  - Deadpool & Wolverine (Wade Wilson/Deadpool)
- Paul Bettany
  - The Da Vinci Code (Silas)
  - Iron Man (J.A.R.V.I.S.)
  - Iron Man 2 (J.A.R.V.I.S.)
  - The Tourist (Insp. John Acheson)
  - Priest (Priest)
  - The Avengers (J.A.R.V.I.S.)
  - Iron Man 3 (J.A.R.V.I.S.)
  - Avengers: Age of Ultron (J.A.R.V.I.S., Vision)
  - Captain America: Civil War (Vision)
  - Avengers: Infinity War (Vision)
  - WandaVision (Vision)
- Chris Evans
  - London (Syd)
  - The Nanny Diaries (Hayden "Harvard Hottie")
  - Push (Nick Grant)
  - What's Your Number? (Colin Shea)
  - Gifted (Frank Adler)
  - Defending Jacob (Andy Barber)
- Leonardo DiCaprio
  - Shutter Island (Edward "Teddy" Daniels)
  - Django Unchained ("Monsieur" Calvin J. Candie)
  - The Wolf of Wall Street (Jordan Belfort)
  - The Revenant (Hugh Glass)
  - Once Upon a Time in Hollywood (Rick Dalton)
  - Killers of the Flower Moon (Ernest Burkhart)
- Ben Foster
  - Alpha Dog (Jake Mazursky)
  - Pandorum (Corporal Bower)
  - Lone Survivor (Matthew "Axe" Axelson)
  - Galveston (Roy)
  - The Contractor (Mike Hawkins)
  - Emancipation (Fassel)
- Josh Stewart
  - Dirt (Holt McLaren)
  - Criminal Minds (William LaMontagne Jr.)
  - The Death and Life of Bobby Z (Monk)
  - The Dark Knight Rises (Barsad)
  - Grimm (Bill)
- James Franco
  - Milk (Scott Smith)
  - Eat Pray Love (David)
  - 127 Hours (Aron Ralston)
  - Future World (Warlord)
  - Zeroville (Vikar)
- Ryan Gosling
  - Half Nelson (Dan Dunne)
  - Gangster Squad (Sergeant Jerry Wooters)
  - Blade Runner 2049 (Officer "Joe" K)
- Jeremy Renner
  - The Hurt Locker (Sergeant First Class William James)
  - The Immigrant (Orlando the Magician/Emil)
  - Arrival (Ian Donnelly)
- 24 (Keith Palmer (Vicellous Reon Shannon), Cole Ortiz (Freddie Prinze Jr.))
- 300 (Astinos (Tom Wisdom))
- The 4400 (Kyle Baldwin (Chad Faust))
- 8 Mile (James "B-Rabbit" Smith, Jr. (Eminem))
- 90210 (Liam Court (Matt Lanter))
- All Quiet on the Western Front (Paul Bäumer (Lew Ayres))
- All the King's Men (Jack Burden (Jude Law))
- The Americans (Philip Jennings (Matthew Rhys))
- Arena (David Lord (Kellan Lutz))
- Armored (Officer Jake Eckehart (Milo Ventimiglia))
- As Above, So Below (Papillon (François Civil))
- Auto Focus (Richard Dawson (Michael E. Rodgers))
- Back to the Future (2014 BS Japan edition) (George McFly (Crispin Glover))
- Basic (Jay Pike (Taye Diggs))
- Beverly Hills Chihuahua 2 (Sam Cortez (Marcus Coloma))
- Big Little Lies (Ed Mackenzie (Adam Scott))
- Black Adam (Ishmael Gregor / Sabbac (Marwan Kenzari))
- Black Hawk Down (SFC Kurt "Doc" Schmid (Hugh Dancy))
- Bones (Jared Booth (Brendan Fehr))
- Bottoms Up (Owen Peadman (Jason Mewes))
- Bully (Derek Kaufman (Leo Fitzpatrick))
- Carlito's Way: Rise to Power (Carlito "Charlie" Brigante (Jay Hernandez))
- Centurion (Quintus Dias (Michael Fassbender))
- Chasing Liberty (Ben Calder (Matthew Goode))
- The City of Your Final Destination (Omar Razaghi (Omar Metwally))
- The Connection (Le Fou (Benoît Magimel))
- The Day After Tomorrow (Parker (Sasha Roiz))
- Dear John (Randy Welch (Scott Porter))
- The Detonator (Dimitru Ilinca (Matthew Leitch))
- The Devil Wears Prada (2010 NTV edition) (Nate Cooper (Adrian Grenier))
- Dexter (Joey Quinn (Desmond Harrington))
- The Diabolical (Nikolai (Arjun Gupta))
- Diary of the Dead (Jason Creed (Joshua Close))
- The Dreamers (Théo (Louis Garrel))
- Drugstore Cowboy (David (Max Perlich))
- Emma (George Knightley (Johnny Flynn))
- Everybody's Fine (Robert Goode (Sam Rockwell))
- The Evil Dead (Scotty (Hal Delrich))
- F1 (Chip Hart (Shea Whigham))
- The Fall (Roy Walker/Black Bandit (Lee Pace))
- Final Destination 3 (Jason Wise (Jesse Moss), Sean (Dylan Basile))
- The Fortress (Seo Nal-soi (Go Soo))
- The Four Feathers (Tom Willoughby (Rupert Penry-Jones))
- Frankenstein (Victor Frankenstein (Oscar Isaac))
- Freddy vs. Jason (Bill Freeburg (Kyle Labine))
- The Front Line (First Lieutenant Kim Soo-hyeok (Go Soo))
- Game of Thrones (Daario Naharis (Michiel Huisman))
- Garden State (Andrew Largeman (Zach Braff))
- Gossip Girl (Damien Daalgard (Kevin Zegers))
- Gotham (Hugo Strange (BD Wong))
- The Great Gatsby (Nick Carraway (Tobey Maguire))
- The Green Inferno (Alejandro (Ariel Levy))
- Grey's Anatomy (George O'Malley (T. R. Knight))
- He Got Game (Sip (Travis Best))
- The Help (Johnny Foote (Mike Vogel))
- The Hitcher (Jim Halsey (Zachary Knighton))
- Hostage (Dennis Kelly (Jonathan Tucker))
- Hot Tub Time Machine (Blaine (Sebastian Stan))
- Hugo (Mr. Cabret (Jude Law))
- I Am Number Four (John Smith/Number Four/Daniel Jones (Alex Pettyfer))
- I Come with the Rain (Meng Zi (Shawn Yue))
- I Feel Pretty (Grant LeClaire (Tom Hopper))
- I'll Always Know What You Did Last Summer (Colby Patterson (David Paetkau))
- iCarly (T-Bo (BooG!e))
- Immortals (Stavros (Stephen Dorff))
- In Time (2025 BS10 Star Channel edition) (Timekeeper Raymond Leon (Cillian Murphy))
- The Incredible Hulk Returns (Donald Blake (Steve Levitt))
- Infernal Affairs II (Chan Wing-yan (Shawn Yue))
- Interstellar (Tom Cooper (Casey Affleck))
- Invictus (Francois Pienaar (Matt Damon))
- Jurassic World (2025 The Cinema edition) (Dr. Henry Wu (BD Wong))
- The King (Elvis Valderez (Gael García Bernal))
- L.A.'s Finest (Ben Walker (Zach Gilford))
- The Last Airbender (Commander Zhao (Aasif Mandvi))
- The Last House on the Left (Francis (Aaron Paul))
- The Last Princess (Yi Wu (Ko Soo))
- Locke (Ivan Locke (Tom Hardy))
- The Lord of the Rings: The Rings of Power (Gil-galad (Benjamin Walker))
- Lovelace (Chuck Traynor (Peter Sarsgaard))
- Lupin III (Michael Lee (Jerry Yan))
- Medium (Sam Elkin (Edoardo Ballerini))
- Meg 2: The Trench (Jiuming (Wu Jing))
- Men in Black (1st Lieutenant Jake Jensen (Kent Faulcon))
- The Mermaid (Octopus (Show Lo))
- Midway (Richard Best (Ed Skrein))
- Miracles from Heaven (Dr. Kevin Beam (Martin Henderson))
- Missing (Consul Phil Putnam (David Clennon))
- Mo' Better Blues (Left Hand Lacey (Giancarlo Esposito))
- Monte Carlo (Riley (Luke Bracey))
- Motherless Brooklyn (Lionel Essrog (Edward Norton))
- The Mummy: Tomb of the Dragon Emperor (Alex O'Connell (Luke Ford))
- NCIS: New Orleans (Christopher LaSalle (Lucas Black))
- Need for Speed (Tobey Marshall (Aaron Paul))
- New Year's Eve (Randy (Ashton Kutcher))
- No Country for Old Men (Deputy Wendell (Garret Dillahunt))
- Numb3rs (Colby Granger (Dylan Bruno))
- The O.C. (D.J. (Nicholas Gonzalez))
- Outcast (Kyle Barnes (Patrick Fugit))
- Oz (Miguel Alvarez (Kirk Acevedo))
- The Pillars of the Earth (Jack Jackson (Eddie Redmayne))
- Pirates of the Caribbean: On Stranger Tides (Scrum (Stephen Graham))
- Populaire (Bob Taylor (Shaun Benson))
- Primeval (Stephen Hart (James Murray))
- Pulse (Josh Ockmann (Jonathan Tucker))
- The Recruit (Alan (Kenneth Mitchell))
- The Ridiculous 6 (Will Patch (Will Forte))
- Rogue One: A Star Wars Story (Cassian Andor (Diego Luna))
- The Rookie (Joel De La Garza (Angelo Spizzirri))
- Rules of Engagement (Hayes Lawrence Hodges III (Nicky Katt))
- Sense8 (Lito Rodriguez (Miguel Ángel Silvestre))
- She's the Man (Duke Orsino (Channing Tatum))
- The Shepherd: Border Patrol (Benjamin Meyers (Stephen Lord))
- Shooter (Bob Lee Swagger (Ryan Phillippe))
- Shooters (Justin "J" (Andrew Howard))
- Shopgirl (Jeremy (Jason Schwartzman))
- Sky High (Lash (Jake Sandvig))
- Smallville (Oliver Queen/Green Arrow (Justin Hartley))
- Smokey and the Bandit II (Little Enos Burdette (Paul Williams))
- Smokey and the Bandit Part 3 (Little Enos Burdette (Paul Williams))
- The Social Network (Divya Narendra (Max Minghella))
- Stalingrad (Sgt. Chavanov (Dmitriy Lysenkov))
- Stand by Me (Ace Merill (Kiefer Sutherland))
- Star Wars (Lieutenant Tanbris (Andy Bradford))
- Stephen King's Desperation (Steve Ames (Steven Weber))
- Stop-Loss (SSG Brandon Leonard King (Ryan Phillipe))
- Suburbicon (Gardner Lodge (Matt Damon))
- Supercross (K.C. Carlyle (Steve Howey))
- The Thing (Adam Finch (Eric Christian Olsen))
- The Third Wheel (Tee (Greg Pitts))
- Three Billboards Outside Ebbing, Missouri (Jason Dixon (Sam Rockwell))
- Top Gun (2009 TV Tokyo edition) (LT. Bill "Cougar" Cortell (John Stockwell))
- Top Gun: Maverick (Beau "Cyclone" Simpson (Jon Hamm))
- Torchwood (Jack Harkness (John Barrowman))
- Tracers (Cam (Taylor Lautner))
- Trash (José Angelo (Wagner Moura))
- Troy (Patroclus (Garrett Hedlund))
- U-571 (Seaman Anthony Mazzola (Erik Palladino))
- Unbroken (Francis "Mac" McNamara (Finn Wittrock))
- The Vampire Diaries (Stefan Salvatore (Paul Wesley))
- Velvet Goldmine (Cooper (Joseph Beattie))
- The Village (Lucius Hunt (Joaquin Phoenix))
- We Own the Night (Robert "Bobby" Green/Grusinsky (Joaquin Phoenix))
- Westworld (Caleb Nichols (Aaron Paul))
- What We Do in the Shadows (Deacon (Jonathan Brugh))
- The Wrath of Becky (Darryl Jr. (Seann William Scott))
- Zulu (Dan Fletcher (Conrad Kemp))

==== Animation ====
- Astro Boy (ZOG)
- The Batman (Bruce Wayne/Batman)
- Batman: The Brave and the Bold (Batman of Zur-En-Arrh)
- Gargoyles (Brooklyn)
- The Lion King (Kamari)
- My Little Pony: Friendship Is Magic (Spear)
- The Save-Ums! (Ka-Chung)
- Yin Yang Yo! (Flayviour)
- Young Justice (Bruce Wayne/Batman)
