= Fuminori Komatsu =

Japanese voice actor

- 小松 史法
- Born: July 23, 1978 (age 48); Tokyo, Japan
- Occupation: Voice actor
- Years active: 2000s–present
- Notable work: JoJo's Bizarre Adventure as Jean-Pierre Polnareff
- Spouse: Michiko Komatsu

Fuminori Komatsu (小松 史法, Komatsu Fuminori; born July 23, 1978) is a Japanese voice actor.

== Filmography ==
=== Television animation ===
- Sumomomo Momomo (2006) (Takao)
- The Tower of Druaga (2008) (Touge)
- Needless (2009) (Kafuka)
- Little Battlers Experience (2011–13) (Junichirō Yamano)
- Battle Spirits: Sword Eyes (2012) (Stinger)
- Jormungand: Perfect Order (2012) (Plame)
- JoJo's Bizarre Adventure: Stardust Crusaders (2014–15) (Jean Pierre Polnareff)
- Magica Wars (2014) (Sōta Hayami)
- The Idolmaster Cinderella Girls (2015) (Manager Imanishi)
- Aikatsu Stars! (2016) (Masaru Nijino)
- All Out!! (2016) (Toshinosuke Matsuo)
- 18if (2017) (Ehyeh)
- JoJo's Bizarre Adventure: Golden Wind (2019) (Jean Pierre Polnareff)
- Great Pretender (2020) (Sam Ibrahim)
- Tropical-Rouge! Pretty Cure (2021) (Butler)
- Vinland Saga Season 2 (2023) (Snake)
- Synduality (2023) (Mouton)
- Chillin' in Another World with Level 2 Super Cheat Powers (2024) (Sleip)
- The Elusive Samurai (2024) (Emperor Go-Daigo)
- Orb: On the Movements of the Earth (2025) (Lewandowski)

=== OVA ===
- Mobile Suit Gundam Unicorn (2011) (Tomura)
- Mobile Suit Gundam: The Origin (2016) (William Kemp)

=== Theatrical animation ===
- Mobile Suit Gundam 00 the Movie: A Wakening of the Trailblazer (2010) (Presidential Aide)
- Inazuma Eleven GO vs. Danbōru Senki W (2012) (Junichirō Yamano)
- A Silent Voice (2016) (Takeuchi)

=== Video games ===
- JoJo's Bizarre Adventure: Eyes of Heaven (2015) (Jean Pierre Polnareff)
- Resident Evil 2 (2019) (Marvin Branagh)
- JoJo's Bizarre Adventure: Last Survivor (2019) (Jean Pierre Polnareff)
- Resident Evil 3 (2020) (Marvin Branagh)
- JoJo's Bizarre Adventure: All Star Battle R (2022) (Jean Pierre Polnareff)
- Tactics Ogre: Reborn (2022) (Martym Noumous)

=== Puppetry ===
- Sherlock Holmes (Jabez Wilson, Abdullah)

=== Dubbing ===
==== Live-action ====
- Shia LaBeouf
  - Transformers (Sam Witwicky)
  - Transformers: Revenge of the Fallen (Sam Witwicky)
  - Lawless (Jack Bondurant)
  - Transformers: Dark of the Moon (Sam Witwicky)
  - Fury (Boyd "Bible" Swan)
  - Man Down (Gabriel Drummer)
  - The Peanut Butter Falcon (Tyler)
  - The Tax Collector (Creeper)
- Aaron Taylor-Johnson
  - Godzilla (Ford Brody)
  - Avengers: Age of Ultron (Quicksilver/Pietro Maximoff)
  - The Wall (Sergeant Allen Isaac)
  - Tenet (Ives)
  - Nosferatu (Friedrich Harding)
- Liam Hemsworth
  - Empire State (Chris Potamitis)
  - Paranoia (Adam Cassidy)
  - Land of Bad (JJ Kinney)
- Kellan Lutz
  - Immortals (Poseidon)
  - The Legend of Hercules (Hercules)
  - Extraction (Harry Turner)
- 12 Monkeys (James Cole (Aaron Stanford))
- The 5th Wave (Evan Walker (Alex Roe))
- A Divisão (Mendonça (Silvio Guindane))
- Ain't Them Bodies Saints (Bob Muldoon (Casey Affleck))
- All of Us Are Dead (Song Jae-ik (Lee Kyu-hyung))
- American Pie Presents: The Book of Love (Rob Shearson (Bug Hall))
- Armored (Dobbs (Skeet Ulrich))
- Baggage Claim (William Wright (Derek Luke))
- The Bank Job (Dave Shilling (Daniel Mays))
- The Blind (Big Al Bolen (Connor Tillman))
- Blood & Treasure (Danny McNamara (Matt Barr))
- Blue Bayou (Antonio LeBlanc (Justin Chon))
- Captain Phillips (Najee (Faysal Ahmed))
- Clerks (Dante Hicks (Brian O'Halloran))
- The Cloverfield Paradox (Michael Hamilton (Roger Davies))
- Crazy Rich Asians, Nicholas "Nick" Young (Henry Golding)
- CSI: Cyber (Elijah Mundo (James Van Der Beek))
- Dark Blood (Boy (River Phoenix))
- Das Boot (Klaus Hoffmann (Rick Okon))
- Deep Blue Sea 3 (Richard Lowell (Nathaniel Buzolic))
- Devil's Due (Zach McCall (Zach Gilford))
- Eagle Eye (Major William Bowman (Anthony Mackie))
- The Exorcist (Father Tomas Ortega (Alfonso Herrera))
- The Expendables 3 (Thorn (Glen Powell))
- Fanboys (Harold Hutchinson (Dan Fogler))
- Faster (Killer (Oliver Jackson-Cohen))
- The Fifth Estate (Daniel Domscheit-Berg (Daniel Brühl))
- Firewall (Vel (Kett Turton))
- First Kill (Levi Barrett (Gethin Anthony))
- Fly Me to the Moon (Cole Davis (Channing Tatum))
- Fright Night (Mark (Dave Franco))
- G.I. Joe: The Rise of Cobra (Conrad S. Hauser / Duke (Channing Tatum))
- G.I. Joe: Retaliation (Conrad S. Hauser / Duke (Channing Tatum))
- Gamer (Simon Silverton (Logan Lerman))
- The Gilded Age (Tom Raikes (Thomas Cocquerel))
- Glory Road (Bobby Joe Hill (Derek Luke))
- Gossip Girl (Rufus Humphrey (Matthew Settle))
- Harry Potter and the Deathly Hallows – Part 1 (Cormac McLaggen (Freddie Stroma))
- Hawaii Five-0 (Ben Bass (Josh Dallas))
- In Time (Henry "Hank" Hamilton (Matt Bomer))
- Ingrid Goes West (Dan Pinto (O'Shea Jackson Jr.))
- Instant Family (Pete Wagner (Mark Wahlberg))
- Interstellar (Doyle (Wes Bentley))
- Jay and Silent Bob Strike Back (Netflix edition) (Silent Bob (Kevin Smith), Dante Hicks (Brian O'Halloran))
- The King's Letters (Buddhist monk Shinmi (Park Hae-il))
- Knights of the Zodiac (Cassios (Nick Stahl))
- Lake Placid: Legacy (Sam (Tim Rozon))
- Last Christmas (Tom Webster (Henry Golding))
- The Legend of 1900 (2020 Blu-Ray edition) (Max Tooney (Pruitt Taylor Vince))
- Legion (Jeep Hanson (Lucas Black))
- Léon: The Professional (2009 Blu-Ray edition) (Mathilda's Taxi Driver (Abdul Hassan Sharif))
- Lockout (Hydell (Joe Gilgun))
- The Lord of the Rings: The Rings of Power (Arondir (Ismael Cruz Córdova))
- Love, Simon (Jack Spier (Josh Duhamel))
- Memory (Vincent Serra (Guy Pearce))
- Million Dollar Arm (Rinku Singh (Suraj Sharma))
- The Monkey (Hal and Bill Shelburn (Theo James))
- Moonlight (Chiron (Trevante Rhodes and Ashton Sanders))
- Mud (Mud (Matthew McConaughey))
- My Soul to Take (Brandon O'Neil (Nick Lashaway))
- Need for Speed (Finn (Rami Malek))
- New Year's Eve (Paul (Zac Efron))
- No Strings Attached (Adam Franklin (Ashton Kutcher))
- Old (Guy Cappa (Gael García Bernal))
- Only the Brave (Jesse Steed (James Badge Dale))
- The Other Side of Hope (Khaled Ali (Sherwan Haji))
- Out of the Furnace (Rodney Baze Jr. (Casey Affleck))
- Pandorum (Manh (Cung Le))
- Paranormal Activity 3 (Dennis (Christopher Nicholas Smith))
- Parkland (Dr. Charles James "Jim" Carrico (Zac Efron))
- Passengers (Jim Preston (Chris Pratt))
- Pennyworth (Thomas Wayne (Ben Aldridge))
- Pompeii (Milo (Kit Harington))
- Project Almanac (David Raskin (Jonny Weston))
- Red Riding Hood (Peter (Shiloh Fernandez))
- Red Sparrow (Nate Nash (Joel Edgerton))
- The Resident (Conrad Hawkins (Matt Czuchry))
- Safe House (2018 BS Japan edition) (Keller (Joel Kinnaman))
- Sense8 (Will Gorski (Brian J. Smith))
- Slumdog Millionaire (Jamal Malik (Dev Patel))
- The Social Network (Eduardo Saverin (Andrew Garfield))
- Star Wars: The Force Awakens (Poe Dameron (Oscar Isaac))
- Step Up Revolution (Sean Asa (Ryan Guzman))
- Step Up: All In (Sean Asa (Ryan Guzman))
- The Swordsman (Tae-yul (Jang Hyuk))
- Terminator: Dark Fate (Rev-9 (Gabriel Luna))
- The Texas Chain Saw Massacre (Kirk (William Vail))
- This Is Us (Kevin Pearson (Justin Hartley))
- Thor (Fandral (Josh Dallas))
- Till Death (Mark (Eoin Macken))
- Trance (Dominic (Matt Cross))
- Trespass (Jonah (Cam Gigandet))
- Triple 9 (Chris Allen (Casey Affleck))
- Tropic Thunder (Alpa Chino (Brandon T. Jackson))
- Trouble with the Curve (Johnny Flanagan (Justin Timberlake))
- U.F.O. (Michael Galloway (Sean Brosnan))
- Under the Silver Lake (Sam (Andrew Garfield))
- Vacancy (The Killer (Scott Anderson))
- The Vampire Diaries (Jeremy Gilbert (Steven R. McQueen))
- Warm Bodies (Perry Kelvin (Dave Franco))

==== Animation ====
- Bee Movie (Adam Flayman)
- Ben 10: Alien Force (Jetray, Big Chill, DNAliens)
- Jelly Jamm (King)
- Lightyear (Airman Diaz)
- Milo Murphy's Law (Milo Murphy)
- Monsters University ("Frightening" Frank McCay)
- ParaNorman (Mitch Downe)
- Ron's Gone Wrong (Graham Pudowski)
- Sausage Party (Frank Wienerton)
- Star Wars Resistance (Poe Dameron)
- Tad, The Lost Explorer (Tad Stone)
- Transformers: EarthSpark (Dr. Alex Malto)

==== Video games ====
- Halo 4 (2012) (Lasky)
- Assassin's Creed IV: Black Flag (2013) (Adewale)
- Batman: Arkham Knight (2015) (Tim Drake)
