= Renford Rejects =

- Title card (later series)
- Genre: Sitcom
- Starring: Matthew Leitch; Martin Delaney; Paul Parris; Charlie Rolland; Roger Davies; Tom Pinto; Holly Davidson; Adam Dean; Bill Homewood; Peter Kane; Tom Weller; Mark Smith; Lucy Punch; Megan Bertie; Mohammed George; Owen Fenton; Samuel Mertus; Ben Mertus
- Opening theme: "Australia" by Manic Street Preachers
- Ending theme: "Requiem for a Golddigger" (Instrumental) by Myself a Living Torch
- Country of origin: England
- Original language: English
- No. of series: 4
- No. of episodes: 52 (list of episodes)

Production
- Production location: England
- Camera setup: Single camera
- Running time: 22–26 minutes
- Production companies: Helion Pictures; Nickelodeon UK

Original release
- Network: Nickelodeon UK
- Release: 23 February 1998 – 28 March 2001

Renford Rejects is a teen sitcom produced and broadcast by Nickelodeon UK between 1998 and 2001. The show aired in the United States on Nick GaS.

The show concerned a five-a-side school football team, made up of aspiring players who had been turned down by their school's main team. Although they originally called themselves the "Renford Rovers", they ended up being named "Renford Rejects" when a rival player sabotaged their league entry form. They decided to stick with the name as it suited their "outcast" nature. The show used to be played at night from 1:50 am to 2:40 am on U.K. Nickelodeon.

== Filming ==
Series 1 was filmed in Autumn 1997, Series 2 in Autumn 1998, Series 3 in Autumn 1999, and Series 4 in Autumn 2000.

The show was filmed at Willesden Sports Centre, London, NW10 3QX. Eddie McAvoy's Gracelands Cafe was filmed at 118 College Road, Willesden, London NW10 5HD.

The 'Cafe' closed in April 2019.

== Cast ==
The regular cast, as is often the case with teen sitcoms, went through a number of changes as its four series went by.

Actor	Character	Position	Seasons			
Actor	Character	Position	1	2	3	4
Martin Delaney	Jason Summerbee	Renford Rejects Team's Captain	Main	Main	Main	Main
Matthew Leitch	Stewart Jackson	Renford Rejects Team's Coach	Main	Main	Main	
Holly Davidson	Robin Walker	Renford Rejects Team's First Girl, Chelsea Ladies Team's Member	Main	Recurring		
Paul Parris	Bruno Di Gradi	Renford Rejects' Team Member	Main	Main	Main	Main
Charlie Rolland	Ben Philipps	Renford Rejects' Goalkeeper	Main	Main	Main	Main
Adam Dean	Ronnie Supra	Renford Rejects' Team Fifth Member	Main	Main	Guest	
Roger Davies	Vinnie Rodriguez	Commentator, Cameraman	Main	Main	Main	Main
Lucy Punch	Sue White	Renford Rejects Team's Second Girl		Main		
Megan Bertie	Mia Smith	Renford Rejects Team's Third Girl			Main	Main
Mohammed George	Dennis Quayle	Renford Rejects' Second Coach				Main
Tom Pinto	Terry Stoker	Razor Captain, Renford Rejects' Rival	Recurring	Recurring	Recurring	Main
Alex Norton	Eddie McAvoy	Owner of the local cafe "Graceland"	Main	Main	Main	Main

=== Main characters ===
- Jason Summerbee (Martin Delaney) - The team's captain, an average working-class teen who in his head was a genius player destined for the top. He is often seen wearing a Hull City jersey. He seems to be a pampered child who tends to tell a lot of lies. In Season 1, when the team makes a trip to London, he starts lying so not to go with them but everybody realizes, although they pretend not to notice. With Robin's help he eventually goes to London too. In another episode, his friends bully him because his lying generates a complex situation between them all, especially with Robin. Apparently Jason has a crush on her, but when he realizes that Robin manipulates him to get a ticket to a football game, he resents her; she also gets mad at him when she discovers that the ticket was not to see famous players. In season 2, Robin appears in few episodes, but both Jason and Robin are happy to interact with each other. The only one who seems not have problems with Jason is Stewart, who in most episodes, acts as his older brother, defending and supporting him, with good chemistry between them.
- Stewart Jackson (Matthew Leitch) - In the first two series, the team was coached by him, an upper-class older boy who had been the school team's star player until an injury (caused by Terry Stoker) prevented him from playing. He supports Chelsea and often wears Chelsea shirts. By the third series, however, he had recovered from his injury and joined as a player, although he still does train the team and, in a few episodes, is referred to as a Player/Manager. As the series progresses he seems to be affected by the craziness of the others. He left after the 40th episode. He is the only person in Renford who recognizes the 1966 England World Cup team.
- "Bruno Di Gradi" (Paul Parris) - Real name Barry Grade, he believed he was an Azzuri superstar, and so constantly spoke in an Italian accent despite really being English. Often wears Italian football shirts and also has the ability to appear and disappear from a scene which the other Rejects never seem to recognize.
- Ben Phillips (Charlie Rolland) - The poetry-loving, bespectacled goalkeeper. Likes to wear shirts with philosophical quotes on them.
- Vinnie Rodrigues (Roger Davies) - Just as the Renford players fantasied about being great footballers, Vinnie fantasied about being a famous commentator and anchorman. He frequently presented on-camera reports on the team, and in his fantasies famous presenters such as Jim Rosenthal often appeared as his co-anchor. In one episode he plays for the Rejects and shows a lot of talent as a player but prefers to stay as a presenter.
- Eddie McAvoy (Alex Norton) - Owner of the local cafe "Graceland", and a fanatical Elvis fan, Eddie often helped out the team, and even coached them later in the series although he seems to do this on a part-time basis and lets Stewart, and later Dennis, handle the training side of things.
- Ronnie Supra (Adam Dean) - For the first two series was the fifth player. He was recognizable as always wearing the latest fashion, always combing his hair on the pitch during games and being the son of the sponsor for the team's strips - his father's firm 'Supra Drain', in which was said that Ronnie would someday work. After series two, Ronnie left the Rejects to start his own Agency, and would appear in one episode of series three to help the Rejects when their local pitch was under threat of having houses built on it.
- Robin Walker (played by Holly Davidson) - She was by far the team's most skillful player, but joined the Rejects due to not being allowed to play for the school team. Some male Rejects appear to have a crush on her, most notably Jason and Stewart, but Robin's apparent crush on Jason was just to get an invitation to a soccer game. During each of the series, the Rejects had a girl playing for them, Robin being the first. Davidson left to further her acting career at the end of the first series (Robin was written out by leaving the Rejects to play for Chelsea ladies' team). Robin appeared in the first episodes of series two, and is spotted that her invitation to Chelsea ladies' team was suggested by her replacement, Sue (originally the plan was for her plan to take Robin's place). Although Robin is very grateful to Sue, the rest of the team is quite upset with her (Sue) for losing their star player (Robin).
- Sue White (Lucy Punch) - Unlike Robin, Sue's lack of footballing ability was more in keeping with the rest of the Rejects team. In Series 2 Episode 1, she was at first Ben's replacement; she was goalkeeper for the match against Razor, but spent the entire game flirting with Terry. Sue realizes that she had no chance to get into the Reject's team but she still got Robin's place, and it's stated that Robin's invitation to Chelsea ladies' team was Sue's original idea. She later transfers to Arctic Rangers and plays as a goalkeeper.
- Mia Smith (Megan Bertie) - She outlasts her predecessors by staying for the third and fourth series. Like Sue, it seems that Mia doesn't have good footballing skills.
- Dennis Quayle (Mohammed George) - Replaces Stewart in Series 4, becoming player/manager and successfully training the Rejects to qualify for the European Beach Football Championships.
- Baby Grade (Peter Kane) - Younger brother of Barry who becomes the de facto mascot for the team as his brother is tasked with taking care of him during the afternoons.
- Terry Stoker (Tom Pinto) - The Rejects' fierce enemy, played for rival team the Razors, whose father, Basil, is the coach. Terry was also responsible for giving the Rejects their name. In the first series it seems that Terry is interested in Robin, as Jason and Stewart, but in second series he (Terry) definitely has a crush on Sue and does not interact with Robin anymore. Later he temporarily replaces Vinny on Sportview and becomes quite popular before his father and the Rejects trick him into quitting.

=== Supporting/Recurring Characters ===
- Basil Stoker (Bill Homewood) - Terry's father, was the school's football coach and had been responsible for not picking the Rejects players for his team. He was very cruel and strict. Stoker along with his son, often tried to find ways to either out do or humiliate the Rejects.
- Priscilla McAvoy (Sally Kinghorn) - Eddie's wife, whose face was always hidden from the viewers. Very jealous of Eddie's former girlfriends, particularly Gladys McPherson.
- Jim Rosenthal (Jim Rosenthal) and Bob Wilson (Bob Wilson) - At the beginning of the series they don't know who Vinnie and the Rejects are but as the series progresses they take a keen interest in their results and will interact with Vinnie on a regular basis.

Also appearing was James Corden, who appeared in Don Bruno as Razor #1, where he, along with Terry Stoker, threatened to make Bruno eat his shirt; and Natasha Dilleyston (she appeared in "Heartbreak Hotel and "Ben In Tights"). She played Ben's "love interest" Justine. The episode "Ciao Bambino" featured EastEnders actress Leila Birch, playing Bruno's love interest Gina. Birch and Parris went on to become engaged in real life after meeting on the show. The club trainer Leo was played by Mark Smith, who had recently left the ITV show Gladiators.

The show also featured several comedians in guest roles, including Tony Slattery ("Boyband"), David Baddiel ("Reject TV") and Alexei Sayle ("Action").

== Guest stars ==
A number of famous guest stars from the world of football appeared as themselves throughout the course of the series. These included Ian Rush, Gianfranco Zola, Martin Keown, Shaka Hislop, Roberto Di Matteo, Jon Harley, John Terry, Kasey Keller, Harry Redknapp with the West Ham first team, Jim Rosenthal, Bob Wilson, Stan Bowles, and various members of England's 1966 World Cup-winning team.

== Music ==
As with many similarly themed series, Renford Rejects used a popular contemporary indie song as its theme tune - in this case, "Australia" by the Manic Street Preachers.

Renford Rejects also used an edited version of Rob Dougan's Clubbed To Death (Kurayamino Mix) from his breakthrough album Furious Angels when the Rejects rivals, The Razors, would appear on screen.

"Ready to Go" by Republica and "Tubthumping" by Chumbawamba were songs often heard during a match.

"A Girl Like You" by Edwyn Collins, was the song for Robin in the first season, also "Who Do You Think You Are" by Spice Girls was Sue's song on her debut in season two.
