= List of Renford Rejects episodes =

There are 52 episodes of Renford Rejects.

== Episodes ==
=== Series 1 (1998) ===
No. overall	No. in series	Title	Directed by	Written by	Original release date	Nickelodeon U.S. airdate
1	1	"One of the Guys"	Steven Bawol	Patrick Buckley & Chris Wilson	23 February 1998	13 December 1998
2	2	"Don Bruno"	Unknown	Unknown	24 February 1998	
3	3	"Field of Dreams"	Unknown	Unknown	25 February 1998	
4	4	"Heartbreak Hotel"	Unknown	Unknown	26 February 1998	
5	5	"All in the Mind"	Unknown	Unknown	27 February 1998	
6	6	"The Best Medicine"	Unknown	Unknown	2 March 1998	
7	7	"Ben in Tights"	Unknown	Unknown	3 March 1998	13 December 1998
8	8	"Old Dogs"	Phil Ox	Patrick Buckley & Chris Wilson	4 March 1998	13 December 1998
9	9	"Down the Drain"	Unknown	Unknown	5 March 1998	
10	10	"Just the Ticket"	Unknown	Unknown	6 March 1998	
11	11	"Ciao Bambino"	Unknown	Unknown	9 March 1998	
12	12	"Bowled Over"	Unknown	Unknown	10 March 1998	
13	13	"High Noon"	Unknown	Unknown	11 March 1998	13 December 1998

== Series two ==
No.	Title
1	"Hello Sue"
2	"Pizzi Di Gradi"
3	"Go Kart Go!"
4	"Boom and Bust"
5	"Boyband"
6	"Action"
7	"They Thought It Was All Over"
8	"The Great Escape"
9	"Scouts Honour"
10	"Faust XI"
11	"Colonel Phillips"
12	"We Love You Stoker"
13	"No Thank You Sven"

== Series Three ==
No.	Title
1	"Masterclass"
2	"Famous Footballers"
3	"Another Italian"
4	"Renfordium Rejectii"
5	"Best Laid Plans"
6	"Thank You Bob"
7	"St Jude"
8	"The Agent"
9	"Renford Radio"
10	"Hall of Fame"
11	"Reject TV"
12	"Sponsorship"
13	"Renford Aid"

== Series Four ==
No.	Title
1	"Beachball"
2	"Gorilla"
3	"Tiger in The Woods"
4	"Sports Personality"
5	"Pay Per View"
6	"Strictly Ballroom"
7	"Wild Wild West"
8	"Stand Up Renford"
9	"Mascot"
10	"Gamesmanship"
11	"Renford Record"
12	"Cool 2 Ben"
13	"Real Player"
