= Legend of the Millennium Dragon =

2011 film

- Japanese theatrical poster
- Directed by: Hirotsugu Kawasaki
- Written by: Takafumi Takada (novel); Naruhisa Arakawa; Hirotsugu Kawasaki
- Music by: Ryudo Uzaki
- Production company: Studio Pierrot
- Distributed by: Sony Pictures Entertainment Japan
- Release date: April 29, 2011 (Japan)
- Running time: 98 minutes
- Country: Japan
- Language: Japanese

Legend of the Millennium Dragon (鬼神伝, Onigamiden) is a 2011 Japanese anime film.

== Plot ==
The film begins with a battle between samurai and Oni, "visualized demons that seem to be made of smoke". It does not go well for the samurai, and as the Oni prepare to make their final push to destroy a local temple, Monk Gen'un wipes them all out in one blow with his magic powers. The film then shifts focus over to Jun Tendo, a shy teenage boy, who is transported 1200 years into Japan's past to the Heian era. There, he must enlist the aid of the dragon Yamata no Orochi to resolve a war between humans and Oni. He is bullied over and over because of his weak appearance and lack of skills. Jun is then followed and attacked by an Oni, which he runs away from. While running, Jun finds himself hiding in the temple of Monk Gen'un and is confronted with the truth. Gen'un starts by telling Jun that he is being targeted by the dark monsters and about the war between humans and Oni back in the Heian era. Jun passes out and wakes up at the temple where he meets Raiko Minamoto, a highly skilled swordsman that fights alongside of Gen'un. The people refer to Jun as their savior and treat him as royalty, highly confusing him.

During the night the temple is attacked by Oni, so the humans retaliate and fight back to protect their temple and their "savior." Jun is a descendant of the Magatama clan with a birthmark on his left shoulder. Only direct bloodlines with that birthmark can awaken the full powers of a mythical dragon named Orochi. In order to summon the dragon to save Raiko and everyone else in the village, Jun must chant the incantation. Jun sees that Raiko is in deep trouble and screams his name, awakening the powerful dragon in the process without the incantation. Jun awakes finding himself riding on the back of Orochi, which becomes Jun's servant and source of power.

Jun comes into conflict with Mizuha, an Oni, and find out that they are not the demons that everyone makes them out to be. Instead, the Oni are regular people that wear masks which cause the visualization of the demons. Jun soon learns that the nobles drove the Oni out of their homeland to colonize it, and the Oni are simply trying to reclaim their land. He feels both sides of the story and does not know whom to trust. Mizuha singles out Jun and asked him to join them and fight to project their cause, but Jun refuses to make such a quick decision because he wants to trust both sides. Jun gets pressured by Mizuha and calls upon Orochi to escape. Mizuha jumps on Orochi and escapes with Jun, but they soon hit an anti-Oni barrier and gets struck down by magic power. Jun wakes up to find himself with Tsuna and Kinta, Raiko's fellow swordsmen, who had been searching for Jun to meet up with Raiko.

Gen'un is confronted by a councillor of the temple and his true plans are exposed. Jun becomes furious once he finds out that the councillor was killed and calls upon Orochi. A battle between Oni and Human finally breaks out. Jun orders to stop the battle, but is attacked by Raiko. Jun does not recognize Raiko and is told by an Oni that Gen'un used his powers and turned Raiko and his friends into the Four Heavenly Kings "god-powered suits of armor". Raiko and his friends do not have control over their bodies anymore. Jun finally learns about Gen'un's evil plot and that the councillor's assassination was his doing. Gen'un wants to obtain true greatness and powers of a God.

Before stopping Gen'un, Jun has to defeat Raiko first. Jun, knowing Raiko isn't evil and has no control over himself, tries to talk things through with him, but gets no response until he brings up the death of Raiko's parents and how they were put to death by Gen'un. Gen'un notices that Raiko is starting to resist the powers given to him and strikes him down, destroying the power of the Heavenly Kings and defeating Raiko himself. Jun begins to take the fight seriously and finally knows what he is fighting for. Mizuha hands over two items: a small gem that contains his true power and a dagger that was given to Raiko when he was a child. When placed next to each other, they merge and become a sword that Jun uses to fight. Gen'un then transforms the Four Heavenly Kings into one giant beast and attacks everyone that gets into his way, even his own people. Everyone tries desperately to take down Gen'un, but he is too powerful. Not wanting anymore bloodshed, Jun unleashes all of his power and begins glowing. Orochi is transformed into its final form, true Yamata no Orochi and defeats Gen'un using its ability to control water. The film ends with Jun back in his own time and in his school uniform, now confident and moving on with his life.

== Cast ==
Character	Japanese	English
Jun Tendo	Kenshō Ono	Bryce Papenbrook
Mizuha	Satomi Ishihara	Stephanie Sheh
Genun	Nakamura Shidō II	Lex Lang
Kinta	Kentarō Itō	Terrence Stone
Sadamitsu Usui	Yasuyuki Kase	JB Blanc
Raiko Minamoto	Takashi Kondō	Liam O'Brien
Tsuna Watanabe	Showtaro Morikubo	Ezra Weisz
Maro Taijihino	Akio Nojima	Joe Ochman
Wadatsumi	Masaaki Tsukada	David Lodge
Karasu Tengu		JB Blanc

== Reception ==
Charles Webb wrote in his review that Jun, the main character, spends the first half or so of the movie "whining and repeating things that were just said to him in the form of a question". He also states that it was never discussed why Orochi was "necessary" in the movie.

Jason Yadao wrote in his review for the Honolulu Star-Advertiser that the film is "hamstrung by the story", which he found to be unoriginal. He also observed that many of the secondary characters "just pop up and disappear before we even have a chance to care about them."

Marcello, founder of japancinema.net, agreed, stating "the whole anime lacks a coherent story" and that "characters appear and disappear before the viewer has a chance to get to know them or care about what happens to them." However, he did like that "each frame of this film is hand-drawn, and some of the imagery is quite beautiful, while the supernatural battle scenes are quite epic in scope."

== Release ==
In the US, it was released in a Blu-ray+DVD combo pack on October 4, 2011. It was released on separate Blu-ray and region 2 DVD editions in Scandinavia on October 12, 2011, and it was released in the UK on December 26, 2011.
