= Hoka Hoka Kazoku =

Japanese anime television series

ほかほか家族
- Genre: Educational, slice of life story
- Anime television series
- Directed by: Teruji Takahashi, Yoshitaka Tsunoda
- Produced by: Tatsuya Ono, Toshio Kobayashi
- Written by: Noboru Shiroyama, Hisatoshi Hiraya
- Music by: Kunio Miyauchi
- Studio: Eiken
- Original network: Fuji TV
- Original run: October 1, 1976 – March 31, 1982
- Episodes: 1,428

Hoka Hoka Kazoku (ほかほか家族; lit. Warm Warm Family) is a Japanese anime television series which aired weekdays on the Fuji TV Network in Japan between October 1, 1976, and March 31, 1982, for a total of 1428 five-minute episodes. It was sponsored by the National Federation of Agricultural Co-operative Associations (now more commonly as JA Zen-Noh).

== Plot ==
The series doesn't have a real plot, but is rather an educational series using both live action and animation to provide information about life in modern Japan. The series content has been compared to that of Bottle Fairy. The series was sponsored by the National Federation of Agricultural Co-operative Associations, as well as by the office of the Prime Minister of Japan.

== Characters ==
Yone Yamano (山野 ヨネ, Yamano Yone)
The grandmother. Voiced by: Akiko Takamura (later replaced by Shō Saitō)
Yutaka Yamano (山野 豊, Yamano Yutaka)
The father of the family. Voiced by: Masaaki Tsukada
Sachiko Yamano (山野 幸子, Yamano Sachiko)
The wife of Yutaka. Voiced by: Mitsuyo Tobe (later replaced by Gara Takashima)
Makoto Yamano (山野まこと, Yamano Makoto)
Son of Yutaka and Sachiko. Voiced by: Takako Kondō
Midori Yamano (山野みどり, Yamano Midori)
Daughter of Yutaka and Sachiko. Voiced by: Yūko Mita
