= Masaaki Tsukada =

Japanese actor (1938–2014)

- 塚田 正昭
- Born: December 16, 1938; Kawasaki, Kanagawa, Empire of Japan
- Died: January 27, 2014 (aged 75); Yokohama, Kanagawa, Japan
- Occupations: Actor; voice actor
- Years active: 1959–2014
- Agent: Mausu Promotion
- Spouse: Masako Nozawa

Masaaki Tsukada (塚田 正昭, Tsukada Masaaki; December 16, 1938 – January 27, 2014) was a Japanese actor and voice actor affiliated with Mausu Promotion. He was married to Masako Nozawa, who is a famous voice actress.

== Biography ==
Tsukada learned acting at Engeki Kenkyūjo (青年演劇研究所), which he completed in 1959. In 1964 he was a member of the acting troupe Gekidan Tōgei (劇団東芸). Later, he joined the Agency Mausu Promotion under contract and shifted to voice acting for anime and dubbing for foreign productions. He often voiced a dignified, high-ranking character or an older man.

Tsukada died on January 27, 2014.

== Filmography ==
=== Films ===
List of voice performances in films
Year	Title	Role	Notes
2007	White Light/Black Rain: The Destruction of Hiroshima and Nagasaki	Narrator	

=== Tokusatsu ===
List of voice performances in tokusatsu
Year	Title	Role	Notes
1964	Phantom Agents	Police officer	
1971	Kamen Rider	Expatriate in Okuyama Village	episode 54
1996	Ultraman	Shiga	

=== Television animation ===
List of voice performances in television animation
Year	Title	Role	Notes
1975	Time Bokan	Arijin	
1976	Hoka Hoka Kazoku	Yutaka	
1979	The Rose of Versailles	Colonel d'Agout	
1979	Lupin III: Part II	Asshi and Dom	Eps. 67 and 132
1983	Lady Georgie	Count Gerald	
1985	Touch	Wedding Ceremony Staff	Ep. 7
1988	F	Koizumi	
1990	Lupin the 3rd: The Hemingway Papers	Antonio	
1991	Lupin the 3rd: Napoleon's Dictionary	United Kingdom Representative	
1993	The Irresponsible Captain Tylor	Wang	
1994	Soccer Fever	Brian	
1994	Brave Police J-Decker	Shunsuke Tôdô	
1996	Chōja Reideen	Seigetsu Kanna (Old)	
1996	Detective Conan	Old Man	
1997	Berserk	High Official, Lord 1 (ep 9) and Minister A (ep 3)	
1997	YAT Anshin! Uchu Ryokou	Old Man	Ep. 14
1997	Flame of Recca	Elder	
1998	Ojarumaru	Kobayashi-cha	
1998	Master Keaton	Subordinate A	Ep. 2
1999	Trouble Chocolate	Mozzarella	
2000	Ghost Stories	Old Man in Haunted House (ep 16) and Satsuki's Grandfather	
2001	Kaze no Yojimbo	Cafe TOMBO Manager	
2001	PaRappa the Rapper	Branch Office Manager	Ep. 6
2001	Hikaru no Go	Ooijer	
2001	Rune Soldier	Foltess	
2001	One Piece	Toto	
2002	Ojamajo Doremi DOKKAAN!	Old Man	Ep. 28
2002	Kiddy Grade	Committee Member A and Superintendent (ep 11)	
2002	Cyborg 009 The Cyborg Soldier	Dr. Herschel	
2002	Digimon Frontier	Mamemon	
2002	Beyblade G-Revolution	Tao	
2002	Patapata Hikōsen no Bōken	Edward Buxton	
2002	Pita Ten	Kaoru & Hiroshi's Butler	
2003	Ashita no Nadja	Farmer (ep 42) and Victorio Capuletti	
2003	Gad Guard	Food Stand Owner	Ep. 10
2003	Zatch Bell!	Alvin, Baraom (ep 28), Doctor (ep 6), Kalaam (ep 28) and Principal (ep 17)	
2003	Someday's Dreamers	Fukui-sensei	Ep. 4
2004	Gakuen Alice	Mikan's Grandfather	
2004	Mars Daybreak	Doze	
2004	Samurai Champloo	Sawa's Husband	Ep. 5
2004	Fullmetal Alchemist	General (ep 27) and Old General (ep 45)	
2004	My-HiME	Jii	
2004	Mujin Wakusei Survive	Porte	
2004	Monster	Farobeck and Hols	
2004	Yakitate!! Japan	Sadanao Azusagawa	
2004	Yugo the Negotiator	Haji	
2005	Bleach	Yamamoto Genryusai Shigekuni	
2005	Emma: A Victorian Romance	Doctor	Ep. 8
2005	Gallery Fake	Blanc	
2006	Government Crime Investigation Agent Zaizen Jotaro	Hotel Manager	
2006	Higurashi no Naku Koroni	Kiichirō Kimiyoshi and Passerby (ep 16)	
2006	Black Lagoon	Wassabu	
2007	Gintama	Omohidezake's Old Man	
2007	Claymore	Village Chief	Ep. 1
2007	CODE-E	Shibata	
2007	Shigurui: Death Frenzy	Mosuke	
2007	Ghost Hound	Old Person	Ep. 13
2007	Tokyo Majin	Kisaragi's Grandfather	
2007	Baccano!	Kanshichiro Yagmal	
2007	Higurashi no Naku Koroni Kai	Kiichirō Kimiyoshi	
2007	Blue Dragon: Trials of the Seven Shadows	Village Headman	
2008	Gegege no Kitarō	Village Elder	Ep. 81
2008	Hatenkō Yūgi	Village Chief	Ep. 7
2008	Porfy no Nagai Tabi	Gasparo	
2008	Stitch!	Seidyou	Ep. 22
2008	Golgo 13	Gabriel RosMcDonald	Ep. 40
2009	Hell Girl: Three Vessels	Holmes	
2009	Sora no Manimani	Principal	
2009	Birdy the Mighty Decode:02	Dohlay	
2009	Maria Watches Over Us 4th Season	Tōko's Grandfather	
2010	The Betrayal Knows My Name	Master Garan	
2010	Shiki	Munehide Murasako	

=== Original video animation (OVA) ===
List of voice performances in original video animation
Year	Title	Role	Notes
1989	Crusher Joe	Barney	
1997	Night Warriors: Darkstalkers' Revenge	Great Sage	
2003	Moeyo Ken	Genzo Iwaguro	
2007	Armored Trooper Votoms: Pailsen Files	General Larkinson	

=== Theatrical animation ===
List of voice performances in theatrical animation
Year	Title	Role	Notes
1988	Mobile Suit Gundam: Char's Counterattack	SSE Captain	
1992	Hashire Melos!	Miltus	
2009	Mai Mai Miracle	Kiyohara no Motosuke	
2011	Legend of the Millennium Dragon	Watatsumi	

=== Video games ===
List of voice performances in video games
Title	Role	Notes
Jak and Daxter	Gol Acheron	

=== Dubbing ===
List of dub performances on overseas roles
Title	Role	Voice dub for	Notes
101 Dalmatians	Alonzo	Tim McInnerny	
102 Dalmatians	Alonzo	Tim McInnerny	
24	James Heller	William Devane	
Aliens	Van Leuwen	Paul Maxwell	
Another Stakeout	Brian O'Hara	Dennis Farina	
Bill & Ted's Bogus Journey (1994 TV Tokyo edition)	Captain Logan	Hal Landon Jr.	
Bowfinger	Hal	Barry Newman	
The Bridge on the River Kwai	Colonel Green	André Morell	
Clear and Present Danger	President Bennett	Donald Moffat	
The Count of Monte Cristo	Morrell	Patrick Godfrey	
Demolition Man (1997 TV Asashi edition)	Captain Healy	Steve Kahan	
Demon Knight	Uncle Willy	Dick Miller	
D-Tox	McKenzie	Robert Prosky	
The Extraordinary Adventures of Adèle Blanc-Sec	Professor Ménard	Philippe Nahon	
Gilda	Uncle Pio	Steven Geray	
Hot Fuzz	Rev. Philip Shooter	Paul Freeman	
It Could Happen to You	Jack Gross	Seymour Cassel	
Kinky Boots	George	Ewan Hooper	
Land of the Dead	Paul Kaufman	Dennis Hopper	
The Last Boy Scout	McCoskey	Clarence Felder	
A League of Their Own	Ernie Capadino	Jon Lovitz	
Mighty Morphin Power Rangers	Mr. Caplan	Henry Cannon	Season 1
New Fist of Fury	Ho Chin		
No Escape	Killian	Don Henderson	
The Purple Rose of Cairo	Larry Wilde	Van Johnson	
The Right Stuff	U.S. Vice President Lyndon B. Johnson	Donald Moffat	
Rogue Trader	Peter Baring	John Standing	
The Sopranos	Junior Soprano	Dominic Chianese	
Under Siege 2: Dark Territory	Admiral Bates	Andy Romano	
Waterworld	Old Gregor	Michael Jeter	
West Side Story	Glad Hand	John Astin; 1990 TBS edition	
The World Is Not Enough	R	John Cleese; 2003 TV Asahi edition	

Animation
Title	Role	Notes
American Dragon: Jake Long	Lao Shi "Grandpa"	
Over the Hedge	Ozzie	
Recess	Dr. Slicer	
Spider-Man	Spencer Smythe	
TUGS	O.J., Captain Zero, Sea Rogue's Uncle, The Municipal Garbage Corporation Owner, Quarry Master	
