= Hazedon =

Japanese anime television series

ハゼドン
- Anime television series
- Directed by: Osamu Dezaki
- Written by: Hiroyuki Hoshiyama; Yoshitake Suzuki
- Music by: Asei Kobayashi
- Studio: Soeisha
- Original network: Fuji Television
- Original run: October 5, 1972 – March 29, 1973
- Episodes: 26 (51 segments)

Hazedon (ハゼドン; Chief Joker) is a Japanese adventure anime series produced by Soeisha (later renamed as Sunrise). Its 26 episodes were aired from October 5, 1972, to March 29, 1973, on Fuji Television. It was the first series to be produced by Sunrise; later in the 1970s, the studio would become known for Mobile Suit Gundam, as well as other sci-fi action series. Most of the show's episodes are split into two 11-minute segments. The only episode to have one 22-minute story is the final episode.

== Plot ==
The plot focuses on a goby fish named Hazedon, who sets off to become the strongest fish in the world as a promise to his mother. He travels the world on an adventure with the blowfish Puyan and the mermaid Shiran.

== Production ==
Hazedon was Sunrise (then Soeisha)'s debut work. Osamu Dezaki was the chief director of the first 10 episodes, withdrawing midway through the series. For the second half, Dezaki would be replaced by Fumio Ikeno, leading other members in the show's production. According to an interview by Sunrise World under the Atom's Genes, Gundam's Dream series, Masako Iizuka recalled that production for Hazedon was done in a small space on the second floor of a coffee shop.

== Characters ==
Hazedon (ハゼドン)
Voiced by: Nobuyo Ōyama
Shiran (シーラン, Shīran)
Voiced by: Reiko Mutō
Puyan (プーヤン, Pūyan)
Voiced by: Kaneta Kimotsuki
Tabou (ター坊, Tābō)
Voiced by: Noriko Ohara
Icchin (イッチン, Itchin)
Voiced by: Takako Sasuga
Karisumi (カリ子)
Voiced by: Keiko Tomochika
Tamii (タミイ)
Voiced by: Reiko Katsura
Takoroku (タコ六)
Voiced by: Minoru Yada
Ikatei (イカ亭)
Voiced by: Shunsuke Shima
Ikatei's wife (イカ亭の妻)
Voiced by: Reiko Suzuki
Hazedon's mother (ハゼドンの母)
Voiced by: Akiko Takamura

== Episode listing ==
No.	Title	Original release date
1	"Hazedon has Arrived!"; Transliteration: "Hazedon ga Yattekita!" (ハゼドンがやってきた!)	October 5, 1972
1	"Strongest in the World"; Transliteration: "Tsuyoi zo Sekaiichi" (強いぞ世界一)	October 5, 1972
2	"Dreaming Shiran"; Transliteration: "Yumemiru Shīran" (夢見るシーラン)	October 12, 1972
2	"Tamii-chan's Happiness"; Transliteration: "Tamii-chan no Shiawase" (タミイちゃんの幸せ)	October 12, 1972
3	"A Hectic Beauty Contest"; Transliteration: "Ten'yawan'ya no Bijin Kontesuto" (てんやわんやの美人コンテスト)	October 19, 1972
3	"The Crab Barbershop is a Big Deal"; Transliteration: "Kani no Tokoya wa Ōsawagi" (カニの床屋は大騒ぎ)	October 19, 1972
4	"The Sardine Thief"; Transliteration: "Iwashi no Kosodoro-san" (イワシのコソドロさん)	October 26, 1972
4	"Everyone's Big Gifts"; Transliteration: "Min'na no Dekkai Okurimono" (みんなのデッカイ贈り物)	October 26, 1972
5	"Fight, Hazedon!"; Transliteration: "Tatakae Hazedon!" (たたかえハゼドン!)	November 2, 1972
5	"Mutsugoro's Proposal"; Transliteration: "Mutsugorō no Puropōzu" (ムツゴローのプロポーズ)	November 2, 1972
6	"Hooray for First Love!"; Transliteration: "Hatsukoi Banzai!" (初恋バンザイ!)	November 9, 1972
6	"Ah, Eyelid Mother"; Transliteration: "Ā, Mabuta no Okkasan" (ああ、まぶたのおっかさん)	November 9, 1972
7	"Find the Black Flower!"; Transliteration: "Kuroi Hana o Sagase!" (黒い花をさがせ!)	November 16, 1972
7	"Shiran's Fashion Show"; Transliteration: "Shīran no Fasshonshō" (シーランのファションショー)	November 16, 1972
8	"Echo of the Flute"; Transliteration: "Hibike ka Tami no Yokobue" (ひびけかたみの横笛)	November 23, 1972
8	"Phantom Thief Sabaranko"; Transliteration: "Kaitō Sabaranko" (怪盗サバランコ)	November 23, 1972
9	"Ah! The Far West"; Transliteration: "Ā! Harukanaru Seibu" (ああ! はるかなる西部)	November 30, 1972
9	"A Random Genius Painter"; Transliteration: "Detarame Tensai Gaka" (でたらめ天才画家)	November 30, 1972
10	"Junk Angorakon"; Transliteration: "Garakuta Angorakon" (がらくたアンゴラコン)	December 7, 1972
10	"Jinbei-san is Sticking his Tongue Out"; Transliteration: "Jinbe E-san wa Akkanbē" (ジンベイさんはアッカンベー)	December 7, 1972
11	"Welcome, Ghost-kun"; Transliteration: "Irasshaimase Obake-kun" (いらっしゃいませオバケくん)	December 14, 1972
11	"Circus Boy Today!"; Transliteration: "Sākasu Bōya Kyō wa!" (サーカス坊や今日は!)	December 14, 1972
12	"Where is the Whale"; Transliteration: "Kujiragon wa Dokkoisho" (クジラゴンはどっこいしょ)	December 21, 1972
12	"The Popular Pendant"; Transliteration: "Mote Mote Pendanto" (もてもてペンダント)	December 21, 1972
13	"Go! Surprise Bus"; Transliteration: "Susume! Bikkuri Basu" (進め! ビックリバス)	December 28, 1972
13	"The Great Fun Chase"; Transliteration: "Yu Kaina Daitsuiseki" (ゆかいな大追跡)	December 28, 1972
14	"New Year's Money is the First Dream of the Year"; Transliteration: "Otoshidama wa Hatsuyume" (お年玉は初夢)	January 4, 1973
14	"Oh My! Jumbo Hazedon"; Transliteration: "Oya Oya Janbohazedon" (おやおやジャンボハゼドン)	January 4, 1973
15	"Brave Hazedon Detectice Story"; Transliteration: "Appare Hazedon Torimono Jō" (あっぱれハゼドン捕物帖)	January 11, 1973
15	"The Sly Bride"; Transliteration: "Chakkari Hanayome-san" (ちゃっかり花嫁さん)	January 11, 1973
16	"Hazedon the Big Star"; Transliteration: "Hazedon wa Daisutā" (ハゼドンは大スター)	January 18, 1973
16	"The Mysterious Pilgrim Granny"; Transliteration: "Nazo no Junrei Obā-san" (謎の巡礼おばあさん)	January 18, 1973
17	"It's Tough Being a Man, Hazedon"; Transliteration: "Otoko Hazedon wa Tsurai Yo" (男ハゼドンはつらいよ)	January 25, 1973
17	"It's Friendship! Hazedon"; Transliteration: "Yūjōda Yo! Hazedon" (友情だよ! ハゼドン)	January 25, 1973
18	"The Great Operation to Expel Abare-Bo"; Transliteration: "Abare-ra Bō Tsuihō Daisakusen" (あばれら坊追放大作戦)	February 1, 1973
18	"Ankoragon is the President"; Transliteration: "Ankoragon wa Daishachō" (アンコラゴンは大社長)	February 1, 1973
19	"Burning Hazedon World No. 1"; Transliteration: "Moeru Hazedon Sekaiichi" (燃えるハゼドン世界一)	February 8, 1973
19	"Captain Tot's Treasure"; Transliteration: "Kyaputentotto no Takara" (キャプテントットの宝)	February 8, 1973
20	"His Rival is Gurnard II"; Transliteration: "Raibaru wa Hōbō Nisei" (ライバルはホウボウ二世)	February 15, 1973
20	"Marriage is Scary"; Transliteration: "Kekkon wa Kowai na" (結婚はこわいな)	February 15, 1973
21	"Hazedon is the Best Dad in the World"; Transliteration: "Hazedon wa Sekaiichi no Papa" (ハゼドンは世界一のパパ)	February 22, 1973
21	"Defeat Kintoki Suzu!"; Transliteration: "Suzukintoki o Yattsukero!" (スズキントキをやっつけろ!)	February 22, 1973
22	"Farewell! Poka Town"; Transliteration: "Saraba! Poka no Machi" (さらば! ポカの町)	March 1, 1973
22	"Firefly Squid Angel"; Transliteration: "Hotaruika no Tenshi" (ホタルイカの天使)	March 1, 1973
23	"Pendant of Life"; Transliteration: "Inochi no Pendanto" (命のペンダント)	March 8, 1973
23	"Hazedon Flies in the Sky"; Transliteration: "Hazedon Sora o Tobu" (ハゼドン空をとぶ)	March 8, 1973
24	"Hazedon's Flute Sword Technique"; Transliteration: "Hazedon no Yokobue Kenpō" (ハゼドンの横笛剣法)	March 15, 1973
24	"Chase the Shooting Star!"; Transliteration: "Nagareboshi o Oe!" (流れ星を追え!)	March 15, 1973
25	"Hazedon is a Great Doctor"; Transliteration: "Hazedon wa Meii-san" (ハゼドンは名医さん)	March 22, 1973
25	"Hazedon is a Traveling Actor"; Transliteration: "Hazedon wa Tabiyakusha" (ハゼドンは旅役者)	March 22, 1973
26	"Let's Go, Hazedon"; Transliteration: "Rettsu Gō Hazedon" (レッツ・ゴー ハゼドン)	March 29, 1973
