= 24Seven (British TV series) =

- Also known as: 24 Seven
- Genre: Drama
- Written by: Mark Clompus; Marvin Close; Moray Hunter
- Directed by: Emma Lindley
- Starring: Hayley Newton; Roger Davies; Fiona Wade
- Opening theme: Theme Music
- Ending theme: Theme Music (instrumental)
- Country of origin: United Kingdom
- Original language: English
- No. of series: 2

Production
- Running time: 30 minutes
- Production companies: Granada Productions; The N Original Productions

Original release
- Network: ITV (CITV)
- Release: 1 April 2002 – 20 January 2003

24Seven is a British television series that ran from 2001 until 2002. It aired in the United Kingdom on CITV and in the US on Noggin's teen-aimed block, The N.

== Plot and casting departure ==
The series focused on a group of students living at Discovery House, a dorm at the Oaks Boarding School. All of the storylines focused on the love triangle involving Miles Silverstone, his girlfriend Anya Vicenze, and his brother Chris, who had an eye for Anya. Another major plotline was that of Tally's "celeb" mother, whom Tally constantly boasted about, but never came to visit. Another major plotline was that of Bethan and the county running team and qualifying for it.

Samuel Crowder who played Chad, left after series one due to creative differences with the director, stating "I didn't like the direction my character was going in. I was concerned about being typecast as a hipster".

== Cast ==
- Jordan Frieda as Miles Silverstone (Series 1)
- Fiona Wade as Anya Vicenze
- Royce Cronin as Chris Silverstone
- Neil Henry as Heinz Otto "Beans" Van Damme
- Pippa Nixon as Jax Duffy
- Hayley Newton as Tallulah "Tally" Hunter
- Sadie Pickering as Bethan Davis
- Augustus Prew as Drew Jessup
- Jack Lloyd-Davies as Vincent "Staggsy" Staggs
- Samuel Crowder as Chad "Curly" Jones (Series 1)
- Roger Davies-Roberts as Jasper
