= Doraemon: Nobita in the Wan-Nyan Spacetime Odyssey =

2004 film by Tsutomu Shibayama

- Theatrical release poster
- Directed by: Tsutomu Shibayama
- Based on: Doraemon Long Stories: Nobita in the Wan-Nyan Spacetime Odyssey by Fujiko F. Fujio Pro
- Produced by: Junichi Kimura; Toshihide Yamada; Kumi Ogura; Masataka Osawa
- Starring: Nobuyo Ōyama; Noriko Ohara; Michiko Nomura; Kaneta Kimotsuki; Kazuya Tatekabe; Megumi Hayashibara; Hitomi Shimatani; Tomokazu Seki; Hisao Egawa; Mika Kanai; Shigeru Izumiya; Osamu Saka
- Music by: Katsumi Hori
- Production company: Shin-Ei Animation
- Distributed by: Toho
- Release date: March 6, 2004
- Running time: 84 minutes
- Country: Japan
- Language: Japanese
- Box office: $27.9 million

Doraemon: Nobita in the Wan-Nyan Spacetime Odyssey (ドラえもん のび太のワンニャン時空伝, Doraemon: Nobita no Wan Nyan Jikūden) is a 2004 Japanese animated science fiction disaster film, based on the 24th volume of the same name in the Doraemon Long Stories manga series. Directed by Tsutomu Shibayama, the film premiered in Japan on March 6, 2004. It is the twenty fifth Doraemon feature film and served to celebrate both the 25th anniversary of the Doraemon television anime series and the 25th anniversary of the Doraemon feature film series. Partially based on the 1980 chapter "A Home for "Ruff", it is the final Doraemon film in the 1979 series and the last to feature the original voice cast.

== Plot ==
The film opens with an elderly dog entering a time machine, planning to travel to the future in order to meet someone who gave him a kendama. However, the machine hits a time-space anomaly and malfunctions, causing the dog to regress to infancy. He is then found by a researcher cat.

In the present day, Nobita finds a stray dog drowning in a river after playing with Gian and Suneo. He rescues the dog, but it ends up following him around. He decides to take it home with him, with Doraemon helping to hide it with the Kennel on the Wall. Nobita names the dog Ichi (from "one", a homophone for a dog's bark in Japanese) and plays with it using the kendama. He introduces the dog to Shizuka, who finds him cute. Soon after, he also adopts a stray cat he names Zubu (meaning "wet" in Japanese), found during a rainstorm. Nobita's mother Tamako grows suspicious and goes to check his room.

To avoid getting caught, Nobita, Shizuka, and Doraemon use the Anywhere Door to travel to the mountains, where they discover more abandoned pets endangered by deforestation. With too many animals to care for, Nobita and his friends decide to send them 300 million years into the past—before any other life forms ever existed. Using the Ray of Evolution, they enable the animals to use a food-making machine, before leaving, with Nobita promising Ichi that he'll return.

When they try to visit the animals again the next day, a time-space anomaly causes them to land 1,000 years from their intended time. To their shock, the dogs and cats have used the Ray of Evolution excessively and formed a futuristic, civilized society.

With the time machine broken, the group must wait for repairs. Meanwhile, they explore the society and meet a gang of teen thieves—Bulltaro, Duk, Chiko, and their leader Hachi. Nobita suspects Hachi is actually Ichi, despite the difference in time.

They visit an amusement park believed by the Hachi and his animal friends to secretly house their imprisoned parents. Together, they drill into the park and discover a room with a time machine. However, they are ambushed by guards. Doraemon is stunned and captured while Nobita and the others are imprisoned.

Meanwhile, the government predicts a cluster of asteroids will strike Earth. They order Noradium, a material needed to build evacuation spacecrafts. But Noradium is stolen by Nekojara, a corrupt official.

Doraemon wakes up to meet Nekojara, who reveals his plan to use a Noradium-powered time machine to take revenge on humanity for abandoning animals. He intends to use the Ray of Evolution's devolve function, as described in a prophecy written by his ancestor Zubu. He tricks Doraemon into fixing the ray by threatening to kill Shami, a cat idol that Doraemon had fallen in love with—who is actually a minion working for Nekojara.

Freed from prison thanks to Suneo distracting the guard dogs with a toy mouse, Nobita and the others launch a mission to rescue Doraemon and recover the Noradium. Doraemon breaks the Ray of Evolution and escapes with Shami, who turns against Nekojara after he attacks Doraemon. Nobita and Hachi manage to stop the time machine, but a meteor hits it, sinking it and destroying the Noradium.

Hachi is submerged underwater, and Nobita rescues him. This triggers Hachi to remember that he is Ichi, the elderly dog who was seen at the beginning of the movie. He recalls hiding a Nobita-shaped statue made of pure Noradium. The group retrieves the statue and brings it to the government. Nekojara attacks again but is defeated by Doraemon, Ichi and Nobita.

With the Noradium, the government complete multiple spacecrafts and are able to evacuate everyone—including Nekojara and his minions—just before the asteroids hit.

The film ends with Nobita and his friends bidding farewell to Ichi and his animal friends as they leave the city moments before it is destroyed. During the credits, Nobita and his friends return to the present and say their goodbyes.

== Cast ==
Character	Japanese voice actor
Doraemon	Nobuyo Ōyama
Nobita Nobi	Noriko Ohara
Shizuka Minamoto	Michiko Nomura
Takeshi "Gian" Gōda	Kazuya Tatekabe
Suneo Honekawa	Kaneta Kimotsuki
Hachi/Ichi	Megumi Hayashibara
Old Ichi	Osamu Saka
Chiko	Hitomi Shimatani
Duk	Tomokazu Seki
Bulltaro	Hisao Egawa
Shami	Mika Kanai; Hitomi Shimatani (singing voice)
Nekojara	Shigeru Izumiya
Nyago	Toshio Furukawa
President	Tōru Ōhira
Zubu	Yūko Mizutani
Hachi's mother	Keiko Han
Tama	Nana Yamaguchi
Nekojara's soldiers	Shin Aomori; Shinya Ōtaki
Secretaries	Kenichi Ogata; Bin Shimada
Advisor	Jun'ichi Sugawara
Attraction Presenter	Shinichiro Ohta
Policemen	Yuu Shimaka; Kōzō Mito
Fish Vendor	Takashi Taguchi
Nyako	Yūko Satō
Anchorman	Noritsugu Watanabe
Tamako Nobi	Sachiko Chijimatsu
Nobita's grandmother	Akiko Takamura
Mrs. Gōda	Kazuyo Aoki

== Production ==
According to the film's director, Tsutomu Shibayama, because a rumor circulated at the production site during the making of the film that "this might be our last time", a remake of Nobita's Dinosaur was initially planned. However, because Shibayama showed heavy reluctance, feeling it was "too heavy a burden," he received a request asking to "make something you like, Shibayama", leading them to do a good-versus-evil jidaigeki story instead.

The production committee of the film received the Special Grand Prize at the 22nd Golden Gross Awards.

== Release ==
The film was released in Japan on March 6, 2004. It was later released in Hong Kong on August 3, 2006.

== Box office ==
Doraemon: Nobita in the Wan-Nyan Spacetime Odyssey grossed a total of $3,755,037 in its opening week in Japan. It was the second highest-grossing film in Japan in its opening week, only being beaten by The Lord of the Rings: The Return of the King. The film grossed a total of $26,114,674 in Japan.

== See also ==
- List of Doraemon films

== Bibliography ==
- Galbraith IV, Stuart (2008). The Toho Studios Story: A History and Complete Filmography. Scarecrow Press. ISBN 9781461673743.
