= Akiko Takamura =

Japanese voice actress (1922–2012)

- 高村 章子
- Born: Akiko Takumi (巧刃 章子); November 9, 1922; Okaya City, Nagano Prefecture, Japan
- Died: June 27, 2012 (aged 89)
- Occupation: Voice actress
- Years active: 1940–2012
- Agent: Advance Promotion
- Website: Advance Promotion official website (in Japanese)

Akiko Takumi (巧刃 章子, Takumi Akiko; November 9, 1922 – June 27, 2012), known professionally as Akiko Takamura (高村 章子, Takamura Akiko), was a Japanese actress.and voice actress from Okaya City, Nagano Prefecture, Japan.

She was the founder, representative director, and chairman (honorary chairman in later years) of Advance Promotion until her death.

== Biography ==
Takamura was born on November 9, 1922, in Okaya City, Nagano Prefecture.

She started off as a trainee at Bungakuza in 1948 and stayed until she departed from the company in 1951. She joined the Mugi-no-kai theater company in 1953, then left one year later in order to become a freelance actor. She was affiliated with Enkyo Pro and Taiyo Promotion.

Takamura died on June 27, 2012, at the age of 89. The cause of her death was never revealed.

== Personality ==
Her voice type was mezzo-soprano. She was known for her voice acting roles as dignified, gentle mother characters and grandmother characters.

Takamura's personal hobbies and special skills were name analysis, folk songs, folk tales, and haiku.

== Filmography ==
=== Television anime ===
- Moomin (1969–1970): Moominmamma
- Star of the Giants (1970): Additional voice
- Kunimatsu-sama no Otoridai (1971): Yoshida's Mother, Kiku
- The Gutsy Frog (1972–1974): Yoshiko's Mother, others
- Hazedon (1972): Hazedon's Mother
- Samurai Giants (1973-1974): Additional voice
- Jungle Kurobē (1973): Additional voice
- Heidi, Girl of the Alps (1974): Additional voice
- Time Bokan (1975): Madame Linden
- Warm Warm Family (1976):Yone Yamano (first voice), Grandmother
- New Star of the Giants (1977-1978): Additional voice
- Song of Baseball Enthusiasts (1978): Otane
- Doraemon (1979–2005): Maternal Grandmother (first voice), Nobita's Grandmother (second voice)
- Anne of Green Gables (1979): Housewife
- Twenty-Four Eyes (1980): Kiku
- New Lupin the 3rd (1980): Pancho's Wife (Ep. 124)
- SAIKYO ROBO DAIOJA 1 (1981-1982): Grandmother
- The Call of the Wind (1981): Additional voice
- The Monster Kid (1982): Hazukashira's Mother
- Glass Mask (1984): Mrs. Yamashita (Eps 18-19)
- Pro Golfer Saru (1985–1988): Mother
- Animated Classics of Japanese Literature (1986): Old Teahouse Woman
- New Pro Golfer Saru (1988): Mother
- 108 Ward Inside and Out: Make-Up Artist (1990): Kakadono (Kosanba's Mother)
- My Daddy Long Legs (1990): Headmaster
- World Fairy Tale Series (1995): Grandmother
- Great Detective Conan (1996–present): Shizuka Omori (Ep. 273)

=== Theatrical animation ===
- Moomin (1972): Moominmamma
- New Star of the Giants (1977): Additional voice
- Heidi, Girl of the Alps (1979): Additional voice
- Song of Baseball Enthusiasts: Wolf of the North, Tiger of the South (1979): Additional voice
- Gauche the Cellist (1982): Mother Mouse
- A Grandmother's Recollections (short film) (2000): Nobita's Grandmother
- Doraemon: Nobita in the Wan-Nyan Spacetime Odyssey (2004): Nobita's Grandmother
- Anne of Green Gables: Road to Green Gables (2010): Housewife

=== Original video animation ===
- Green Legend Ran (1992): Old Woman
- Heidi, Girl of the Alps: Alpine Mountain Chapter (1993): Additional voice
- Heidi, Girl of the Alps: Heidi and Clara (1993): Additional voice
- 3×3 Eyes: ~Legend of the Divine Demon~ (1995): Grandma Ayanokōji (Ep. 1)
