= AKA (2002 film) =

- Film poster
- Directed by: Duncan Roy
- Written by: Duncan Roy
- Produced by: Richard West
- Starring: Matthew Leitch; Diana Quick; George Asprey; Lindsey Coulson
- Cinematography: Steve Brooke Smith; Ingrid Domeij; Steve Smith; Scott Taylor; Claire Vinson
- Edited by: Lawrence Catford; Jon Cross; Jackie Ophir
- Music by: Matt Rowe
- Distributed by: Empire Pictures Inc.
- Release date: 19 January 2002
- Running time: 123 min
- Country: United Kingdom
- Language: English

AKA is a 2002 drama film, the first by director and writer Duncan Roy. The film is set in the late 1970s in Britain and follows the story of Dean, an 18-year-old teenager who assumes another identity to infiltrate high society. Dean meets David, an older gay man who desires him and Benjamin, a young Texan hustler. It is largely an autobiographical account of Duncan Roy's early life.

The film is presented in a three-frame split-screen format, showing simultaneous perspectives.

== Cast ==
- Matthew Leitch as Dean Page
- Diana Quick as Lady Gryffoyn
- George Asprey as David Lord Glendening
- Lindsey Coulson as Georgie
- Blake Ritson as Alexander Gryffoyn
- Peter Youngblood Hills as Benjamin
- Geoff Bell as Brian Page
- Hannah Yelland as Camille Sturton
- Daniel Lee as Jamie Page
- Bill Nighy as Uncle Louis Gryffoyn
- David Kendall as Lee Page
- Fenella Woolgar as Sarah
- Sean Gilder as Tim Lyttleton
- Robin Soans as Neil Frost
- Stephen Boxer as Dermot

== Reception ==
The film has been nominated for several awards, especially in the gay community.

- 2002 – Nominated for the British Independent Film Awards.
- 2002 – Won the Seattle Lesbian & Gay Film Festival.
- 2002 – Won the Miami Gay and Lesbian Film Festival.
- 2002 – Won L.A. Outfest.
- 2002 – Won the Copenhagen Gay & Lesbian Film Festival.
- 2003 – Nominated for the BAFTA Awards.
- 2003 – Nominated for the Emden International Film Festival.
- 2004 – Won the Los Angeles Film Critics Association Awards.
