= Gara Takashima =

Japanese actress

- 高島 雅羅
- Born: Yumiko Takashima; March 2, 1954 (age 72); Asakusa, Taitō, Tokyo, Japan
- Occupations: Actress; voice actress
- Years active: 1976–present
- Agent: Aoni Production
- Height: 154 cm (5 ft 1 in)
- Spouse: Banjō Ginga

Yumiko Takashima (高島 由美子, Takashima Yumiko; born March 2, 1954), known by her stage name Gara Takashima (高島 雅羅, Takashima Gara) is a Japanese actress and voice actress who works for Aoni Production. She is married to voice actor Banjō Ginga.

== Filmography ==
=== Television animation ===
1970s

- Hoka Hoka Kazoku (1976) (Sachiko Yamano)
- Aim for the Ace! (1978) (Michiru Taki)
- Space Battleship Yamato II (1978)
- Lupin the 3rd Part II (1978)
- Anne of Green Gables (1979) (Diana Barry)
- Gordian Warrior (Saori Otaki) (1979)
- The Rose of Versailles (1979)

1980s

- Space Runaway Ideon (1980) (Rukuku Kil)
- Braiger (1982) (Anastasia, Eva)
- Space Cobra (1982) (Dominique Royal)
- Game Center Arashi (1982) (Erika Noto)
- Magical Princess Minky Momo (1982)
- Aura Battler Dunbine (1983)
- Baxinger (1983)
- Giant Gorg (1984) (Lady Links)
- Persia, the Magic Fairy (1984) (Kumi Hayami)
- Mobile Suit Zeta Gundam (1985) (Hilda Bidan)
- The Three-Eyed One (1985) (Chiyoko Wato)
- Touch (1985) (Reiko Kashiwaba)
- Fight! Super Robot Life Form Transformer (1985) (Carly Witwicky)
- Maison Ikkoku (1986) (Asuna's mother)
- Seito Shokun! (1986) (Michiko Kitashiro)
- Fight! Transformers 2010 (1986) (Carly Witwicky)
- Uchūsen Sagittarius (1986) (Beat)
- City Hunter (1987) (Saori Murakoshi)
- Fist of the North Star (1987) (Sayaka)
- F (1988) (Shizue)
- Grimm's Fairy Tale Classics (1988) (Hanna)
- Oishinbo (1988) (Nobuko Mayama)

1990s

- Ginga Sengoku Gun'yūden Rai (1994) (Dokuganryu Masamune)
- Detective Conan (1996) (Eri Kisaki)
- Clamp School Detectives (1997) (Suoh's Mother)
- Cowboy Bebop (1998) (Julia)
- Silent Möbius (1998) (Rosa Cheyenne)
- Crest of the Stars (1999) (Plakia Lexshue)
- Magic User's Club (1999) (Azusa Amano)
- Zoids: Chaotic Century (1999) (President Louise Theresa Camford)

2000s

- Z.O.E. Dolores, I (2001) (Linda Roland)
- Ai Yori Aoshi (2002) (Aoi's Mother)
- Aquarian Age (2002) (Misato Yukimura)
- Atashin'chi (2002) (Emi's Mother)
- Full Metal Panic! (2002) (Female Doctor)
- Ghost in the Shell: Stand Alone Complex (2003) (Seymour)
- Human Crossing (2003) (Mizuho Noguchi)
- Rumic Theater (2003) (Hanako)
- Kenran Butohsai (2004) (MAKI)
- Maria-sama ga Miteru: Printemps (2004) (Yumiko Ikegami)
- Emma: A Victorian Romance (2005) (Dorothea Molders)
- Monster (2005)
- Speed Grapher (2005) (Shinsen Tennouzu)
- Ah! My Goddess: Everyone Has Wings (2006) (Hild)
- Angel Heart (2006) (Woman President)
- Emma: A Victorian Romance Second Act (2007) (Dorothea Molders)
- Devil May Cry: The Animated Series (2007) (Amanda)
- Slayers Revolution (2008) (Gioconda)

2010s

- Chu-Bra!! (2010) (Yōko Sagisawa)
- Jormungand (2012) (Amalia Trohovski)
- Orange (2016) (Kakeru's grandmother)
- Wise Man's Grandchild (2019) (Melinda Bowen)

2020s

- BNA: Brand New Animal (2020) (Barbaray Rose)
- Great Pretender (2020) (Akemi Suzaku)
- The Tale of the Outcasts (2023) (Iberta)

=== Theatrical animation ===
- Windaria (1986) (Druid)
- Doraemon: Nobita and the Birth of Japan (1989) (Tsuchidama)
- Silent Möbius (1991) (Lebia Maverick)
- Silent Möbius 2 (1992) (Lebia Maverick)
- Ninja Scroll (1993) (Benisato)
- Memories (1995) (Eva)
- Detective Conan: The Fourteenth Target (1998) (Eri Kisaki)
- Mobile Suit Gundam: The 08th MS Team Miller's Report (1998) (Alice Miller)
- Detective Conan: Captured in Her Eyes (2000) (Eri Kisaki)
- Detective Conan: Magician of the Silver Sky (2004) (Eri Kisaki)
- Mobile Suit Z Gundam: A New Translation - Heirs to the Stars (2005) (Hilda Bidan)
- Detective Conan: The Private Eyes' Requiem (2006) (Eri Kisaki)
- Appleseed Ex Machina (2007) (Athena)
- Dragon Age: Dawn of the Seeker (2012) (Divine)

=== OVA ===
- Crying Freeman (1988) (Nina Heaven)
- Mermaid Saga (1993) (Misa)
- Blue Submarine No. 6 (1998) (General Gilford)
- Queen Emeraldas (1998) (Siren)
- Virgin Fleet (1998) (Hidemaro Hirose)
- Magic User's Club (1996) (Azusa Amano)

=== Games ===
- The Bouncer (2000) (Kaldea Orchid)
- James Bond 007: Everything or Nothing (????) (Agent Mya Starling)
- Quiz: Ah! My Goddess (????) (Hild)
- Trauma Center: New Blood (????) (Irene Quatro)
- Sly 2: Band of Thieves (????) (The Contessa)
- Phoenix Wright: Ace Attorney – Spirit of Justice (2016) (Ga'ran Sigatar Khura'in)
- Final Fantasy VII Remake (2020) (Elmyra Gainsborough)
- Sonic Frontiers (2022) (The End (Female Voice))

=== Tokusatsu ===
- Seijuu Sentai Gingaman (1998) (Spectral Empress Iliess (eps. 1 - 2, 13, 20, 22 - 34)/Evil Empress Iliess (ep. 34))
- Seijuu Sentai Gingaman vs Denji Sentai Megaranger (1999) (Spectral Empress Iliess)

=== Drama CDs ===
- 7 Seeds (????) (Botan Saotome)

=== Dubbing ===
==== Live-action ====
- Michelle Pfeiffer
  - Scarface (1991 TV Tokyo edition) (Elvira Hancock)
  - The Deep End of the Ocean (Beth Cappadora)
  - A Midsummer Night's Dream (Titania)
  - New Year's Eve (Ingrid Withers)
  - Dark Shadows (Elizabeth Collins Stoddard)
  - The Family (Maggie Blake)
  - Mother! (woman)
  - Ant-Man and the Wasp (Janet van Dyne)
  - The First Lady (Betty Ford)
  - Ant-Man and the Wasp: Quantumania (Janet van Dyne)
- Demi Moore
  - We're No Angels (Molly)
  - Ghost (Molly Jensen)
  - Mortal Thoughts (Cynthia Kellogg)
  - A Few Good Men (Lieutenant Commander JoAnne Galloway)
  - The Scarlet Letter (Hester Prynne)
  - Striptease (Erin Grant)
  - Charlie's Angels: Full Throttle (Madison Lee)
  - The Joneses (Kate Jones)
  - Brave New World (Linda)
- Madeleine Stowe
  - Revenge (1991 TV Asahi edition) (Miryea Mendez)
  - The Two Jakes (Lillian Bodine)
  - Unlawful Entry (1997 TV Asahi edition) (Karen Carr)
  - Bad Girls (1997 TV Asahi edition) (Cody Zamora)
  - Playing by Heart (Gracie)
  - Impostor (Maya Olham)
  - Octane (Senga Wilson)
- Rene Russo
  - Major League (Lynn Wells)
  - Lethal Weapon 3 (Lorna Cole)
  - Ransom (Kate Mullen)
  - Lethal Weapon 4 (Lorna Cole)
  - Two for the Money (Toni Abrams)
  - Yours, Mine and Ours (Helen North)
  - Velvet Buzzsaw (Rhodora Haze)
- Sharon Stone
  - Above the Law (Sara Toscani)
  - Blood and Sand (Doña Sol)
  - Total Recall (Lori Quaid)
  - Scissors (Angie Anderson)
  - Sphere (Dr. Elizabeth "Beth" Halperin)
  - Bobby (Miriam Ebbers)
  - The Burning Plain (Gina)
- Carrie Fisher
  - Star Wars Episode IV: A New Hope (Princess Leia)
  - The Empire Strikes Back (Princess Leia)
  - Return of the Jedi (Princess Leia)
  - The 'Burbs (1992 TV Asahi edition) (Carol Peterson)
  - Star Wars: The Force Awakens (General Leia Organa)
  - Star Wars: The Last Jedi (General Leia Organa)
  - Star Wars: The Rise of Skywalker (General Leia Organa)
- Emma Thompson
  - Love Actually (Karen)
  - Nanny McPhee (Nanny McPhee)
  - Last Chance Harvey (Kate Walker)
  - Nanny McPhee and the Big Bang (Nanny McPhee)
  - Men in Black 3 (Agent O)
  - Men in Black: International (Agent O)
  - Last Christmas (Petra Andrich)
- Daryl Hannah
  - Blade Runner (1986 TBS edition) (Pris Stratton)
  - Wall Street (1992 TV Asahi edition) (Darien Taylor)
  - High Spirits (1992 NTV edition) (Mary Plunkett Brogan)
  - Crazy People (Kathy Burgess)
  - The Last Days of Frankie the Fly (Margaret)
- Barbara Hershey
  - The Natural (1989 TV Asahi edition) (Harriet Bird)
  - Hannah and Her Sisters (Lee)
  - Hoosiers (Myra Fleener)
  - Beaches (Hillary Whitney)
  - Falling Down (Elizabeth "Beth" Trevino)
- Julia Roberts
  - Mystic Pizza (Daisy Araujo)
  - Steel Magnolias (Shelby Eatenton-Latcherie)
  - Pretty Woman (1994 Fuji TV edition) (Vivian Ward)
  - Prêt-à-Porter (Anne Eisenhower)
  - Everyone Says I Love You (Von Sidell)
- Mary Steenburgen
  - Parenthood (Karen Buckman)
  - The Proposal (Grace Paxton)
  - Last Vegas (Diana Boyle)
  - Song One (Karen)
  - A Walk in the Woods (Jeannie)
- Kim Basinger
  - L.A. Confidential (Lynn Bracken)
  - The Burning Plain (Gina)
  - Grudge Match (Sally Rose)
  - Third Person (Elaine Leary)
- Rebecca De Mornay
  - Risky Business (Lana)
  - Runaway Train (1988 TBS edition) (Sara)
  - Backdraft (1995 Fuji TV edition) (Helen McCaffrey)
  - The Three Musketeers (Milady de Winter)
- Melanie Griffith
  - Body Double (Holly Body)
  - Working Girl (1991 TV Asahi edition) (Tess McGill)
  - Shining Through (Linda Voss)
  - Celebrity (Nicole Oliver)
- Diane Lane
  - Vital Signs (Gina Wyler)
  - Judge Dredd (Judge Hershey)
  - My Dog Skip (Ellen Morris)
  - The Glass House (2005 TV Asahi edition) (Erin Glass)
- Andie MacDowell
  - Hudson Hawk (Anna Baragli)
  - Groundhog Day (Rita Hanson)
  - Bad Girls (VHS/DVD edition) (Eileen Spenser)
  - Multiplicity (Laura Kinney)
- Meryl Streep
  - The Iron Lady (Margaret Thatcher)
  - The Post (Katharine Graham)
  - Little Women (Aunt March)
  - Don't Look Up (President Orlean)
- Angela Bassett
  - The Rosa Parks Story (Rosa Parks)
  - Survivor (Ambassador Maureen Crane)
  - Mission: Impossible – Fallout (CIA Director Erika Sloane)
- Geena Davis
  - A League of Their Own (Dorothy Hinson)
  - Stuart Little (Eleanor Little)
  - The Exorcist (Angela Rance / Regan MacNeil)
- Lea Thompson
  - Back to the Future (1989 TV Asahi edition) (Lorraine Baines McFly)
  - Back to the Future Part II (1992 TV Asahi edition) (Lorraine Baines McFly)
  - Back to the Future Part III (1993 TV Asahi edition) (Lorraine Baines McFly)
- Sigourney Weaver
  - Vantage Point (Rex Brooks)
  - The Assignment (Dr. Rachel Jane)
  - Avatar: The Way of Water (Dr. Grace Augustine)
- Kristen Wilson
  - Dr. Dolittle (Lisa Dolittle)
  - Dr. Dolittle 2 (Lisa Dolittle)
  - Dr. Dolittle 3 (Lisa Dolittle)
- 1911 (Empress Dowager Longyu (Joan Chen))
- 3 Days to Kill (Christine Renner (Connie Nielsen))
- 8 Simple Rules (Cate Hennessy (Katey Sagal))
- The Absent-Minded Professor (Betsy Carlisle (Nancy Olson))
- The Abyss (Dr. Lindsey Brigman (Mary Elizabeth Mastrantonio))
- The Addams Family (Morticia Addams (Anjelica Huston))
- Airplane! (1983 TBS edition) (Elaine Dickinson (Julie Hagerty))
- American Ultra (Victoria Lasseter (Connie Britton))
- Angel (Hermione (Charlotte Rampling))
- Anna and the King (Anna Leonowens (Jodie Foster))
- Armour of God II: Operation Condor (Ada (Carol Cheng))
- The A-Team (Tawnia Baker (Marla Heasley))
- Audrey (Mita Ungaro)
- Bandits (Kate Wheeler (Cate Blanchett))
- Batman v Superman: Dawn of Justice (Senator Finch (Holly Hunter))
- Burlesque (Tess (Cher))
- Cannonball Run II (1988 TV Asahi edition) (Jill Rivers (Susan Anton))
- Cat People (1985 Fuji TV edition) (Alice Perrin (Annette O'Toole))
- Christine (1990 TV Asahi edition) (Leigh Cabot (Alexandra Paul))
- Copycat (1998 TV Tokyo edition) (Inspector Mary Jane "M.J." Monahan (Holly Hunter))
- Corky Romano (Agent Kate Russo (Vinessa Shaw))
- Cousins (Maria Hardy (Isabella Rossellini))
- Cowboy Bebop (Julia (Elena Satine))
- Crash (Catherine Ballard (Deborah Kara Unger))
- Criminal Minds: Suspect Behavior (Beth Griffith (Janeane Garofalo))
- CSI: Crime Scene Investigation (Catherine Willows (Marg Helgenberger))
- The Curious Case of Benjamin Button (Elizabeth Abbott (Tilda Swinton))
- Dangerous Beauty (Paola Franco (Jacqueline Bisset))
- Doc Hollywood (Nancy Lee Nicholson (Bridget Fonda))
- Dolittle (Ginko-Who-Soars (Frances de la Tour))
- Don't Say a Word (Aggie Conrad (Famke Janssen))
- Donnie Darko (Rose Darko (Mary McDonnell))
- The Doors (Patricia Kennealy (Kathleen Quinlan))
- Dreamland (Cheryl (Frances Barber))
- Dressed to Kill (1991 TV Asahi edition) (Liz Blake (Nancy Allen))
- End Game (The First Lady (Anne Archer))
- The Equalizer (Susan Plummer (Melissa Leo))
- The Equalizer 2 (Susan Plummer (Melissa Leo))
- ER (Adele Newman (Erica Gimpel))
- Fargo (2002 TV Tokyo edition) (Marge Gunderson (Frances McDormand))
- The First Wives Club (Annie MacDuggan-Paradis (Diane Keaton))
- Fierce Creatures (Willa Weston (Jamie Lee Curtis))
- A Fish Called Wanda (Wanda Gershwitz (Jamie Lee Curtis))
- The Flintstones (Wilma Flintstone (Elizabeth Perkins))
- The Gauntlet (1983 Fuji TV edition) (Augustina "Gus" Mally (Sondra Locke))
- Genius (Elsa Einstein (Emily Watson))
- The Golden Child (1989 Fuji TV edition) (Kee Nang (Charlotte Lewis))
- Hampstead (Emily Walters (Diane Keaton))
- Hard Target (1997 Fuji TV edition) (Natasha Binder (Yancy Butler))
- Heat (Justine Hanna (Diane Venora))
- Hello, My Name Is Doris (Doris Miller (Sally Field))
- IF (Margaret (Fiona Shaw))
- Infernal Affairs II (Mary (Carina Lau))
- In the Mouth of Madness (Linda Styles (Julie Carmen))
- Insomnia (2006 TV Tokyo edition) (Rachel Clement (Maura Tierney))
- Intelligence (Lillian Strand (Marg Helgenberger))
- The Jane Austen Book Club (Jocelyn (Maria Bello))
- Jaws 2 (2022 BS Tokyo edition) (Ellen Brody (Lorraine Gary))
- Joe Versus the Volcano (DeDe (Meg Ryan))
- K-9 (1993 TV Asahi edition) (Tracy (Mel Harris))
- Killing Eve (Carolyn Martens (Fiona Shaw))
- King Kong (Ann Darrow (Fay Wray))
- The Last Boy Scout (Sarah Hallenbeck (Chelsea Field))
- Leatherface (Verna Sawyer (Lili Taylor))
- Léon: The Professional (Mathilda's Mother (Ellen Greene))
- Liar Liar (Audrey Reede (Maura Tierney))
- Limitless (Nasreen 'Naz' Pouran (Mary Elizabeth Mastrantonio))
- Looney Tunes: Back in Action (Kate Houghton (Jenna Elfman))
- Magnolia (Linda Partridge (Julianne Moore))
- The Man Who Cried (Lola (Cate Blanchett))
- Master Z: Ip Man Legacy (Tso Ngan Kwan (Michelle Yeoh))
- The Meddler (Marnie Minervini (Susan Sarandon))
- The Medium (Noi (Sirani Yankittikan))
- Mindscape (Michelle Greene (Saskia Reeves))
- Mojin: The Lost Legend (Ying Caihong (Lin Xiaoqing))
- Mulan (Hua Li (Rosalind Chao))
- The Ninth Gate (Liana Telfer (Lena Olin))
- Nothing but Trouble (Renalda (Bertila Damas))
- The Omen (Mrs. Baylock (Mia Farrow))
- Pacific Heights (Stephanie MacDonald (Laurie Metcalf))
- Police Story 3: Super Cop ("Jessica" Yang Chien-Hua (Michelle Yeoh))
- The Purple Rose of Cairo (Cecilia (Mia Farrow))
- R.I.P.D. (Mildred Proctor (Mary-Louise Parker))
- Rocky Balboa (Marie (Geraldine Hughes))
- Ruby Sparks (Gertrude (Annette Bening))
- The Sea Inside (Julia (Belén Rueda))
- Star Trek: The Next Generation (Deanna Troi (Marina Sirtis))
- Star Trek: Nemesis (Deanna Troi (Marina Sirtis))
- Still Alice (Alice Howland (Julianne Moore))
- Striking Distance (Officer Jo Christmas/Tpr. Emily Harper (Sarah Jessica Parker))
- Sully (Lorraine Sullenberger (Laura Linney))
- Suspiria (1986 TV Tokyo edition) (Sara (Stefania Casini))
- The Tailor of Panama (Louisa Pendel (Jamie Lee Curtis))
- Teenage Mutant Ninja Turtles II: The Secret of the Ooze (April O'Neil (Paige Turco))
- Tenet (Priya (Dimple Kapadia))
- The Terminator (1992 VHS edition) (Sarah Connor (Linda Hamilton))
- Throw Momma from the Train (Beth Ryan (Kim Greist))
- The Tiger and the Snow (Vittoria (Nicoletta Braschi))
- Tomb Raider (Ana Miller (Kristin Scott Thomas))
- Trauma (Adriana Petrescu (Piper Laurie))
- Twin Peaks (Laura Palmer and Maddy Ferguson (Sheryl Lee)
- Twin Peaks (2017) (Laura Palmer (Sheryl Lee))
- Vantage Point (Rex Brooks (Sigourney Weaver))
- Village of the Damned (Jill McGowan (Linda Kozlowski))
- Virus (Nadia Vinogradova (Joanna Pacuła))
- Wasabi (2004 TV Tokyo edition) (Sofia (Carole Bouquet))
- Willow (film) (Sorsha (Joanne Whalley))
- Willow (TV series) (Queen Sorsha (Joanne Whalley))
- The Wedding Singer (Linda (Angela Featherstone))
- When Harry Met Sally... (Sally Albright (Meg Ryan))
- Zombi 2 (1982 TBS edition) (Anne Bowles (Tisa Farrow))

==== Animation ====
- Batman: The Animated Series (Catwoman)
- Delgo (Empress Sedessa)
- Dinosaur (Plio)
- Finding Dory (Jenny)
- Jetsons: The Movie (Jane Jetson)
- Missing Link (Yeti Elder)
- RWBY (Willow Schnee)
- Sinbad: Legend of the Seven Seas (Eris)
- Star Trek: Lower Decks (Deanna Troi)
- Steven Universe (Yellow Diamond)
- Tinker Bell (Queen Clarion)
- Tinker Bell and the Lost Treasure (Queen Clarion)
- Tinker Bell and the Secret of the Wings (Queen Clarion)
- Tinker Bell and the Pirate Fairy (Queen Clarion)

== Awards ==
Year	Award	Category	Result
2015	9th Seiyu Awards	Kazue Takahashi Memorial Award	Won
