= Roger Davies (actor) =

British television and film actor

- Occupation: Actor
- Years active: 1998-present

Roger Davies, also known as Roger Davies-Roberts, is a British television and film actor. He is best known for playing the character Vinnie Rodriguez in the Nickelodeon UK series Renford Rejects, which ran from 1998 to 2001. In 2018, he featured in Netflix/Bad Robot's The Cloverfield Paradox playing Michael Hamilton.

Davies has also appeared in a number of TV series including 24seven, Hounded, The Bill, Blue Peter, Family Affairs, Dream Team, Girls in Love, and NCIS: Los Angeles.

== Filmography ==
=== TV shows ===
- Adi Coleman in Dream Team
- Ryan in Comin' Atcha!
- Paul Hampton in The Bill
- Vinnie in Renford Rejects
- Jasper in 24Seven
- Luke in Girls in Love
- Keith and Evil Keith in Hounded
- Roland Benga in SEAL Team
- John in Too Old to Die Young
- Jeremy Chambers in NCIS: Los Angeles
- Seb in FBI: Most Wanted

=== Movies ===
- Michael in The Cloverfield Paradox
