= Peter Youngblood Hills =

Anglo-American actor

- Born: Johannesburg, South Africa
- Occupation: Actor
- Years active: 1998–present

Peter Youngblood Hills is an Anglo-American actor. He is perhaps best known for his supporting role of Sgt. Darrell "Shifty" Powers in HBO’s World War II mini-series, Band of Brothers.

== Career ==
Peter Youngblood Hills has been a professional actor since 1996. He started his career in acting with various music videos, TV commercials and theater before beginning a career in film. He has appeared in various films like The Beach and The Last of the Blonde Bombshells. His big break was when he appeared in Tom Hanks and Steven Spielberg's Band of Brothers.

He also appeared in a 2002 film, AKA with his Band of Brothers co-star Matthew Leitch. In 2003, he starred as Steve Warson in Michel Vaillant. In 2006, he starred in the Foyle's War Series 4 episode titled "Invasion". Hills had a brief cameo in The Wolf of Wall Street.

Leonardo DiCaprio asked him to do the stylized cinematography for his environmental documentary The 11th Hour. It focused on the conservation and preservation of life.

Due to his role in Band of Brothers, his interests and personal life became focused on 'the recovery from war' which led to a 12-year mentorship with Vietnam Veteran, Sensei and Interfaith Rev. Clifford Ishigaki.

== Filmography ==
=== Film ===
Year	Title	Role	Notes
2014	Faith	Svetli	Short film
2013	The Wolf of Wall Street	Audience Member #1	
2005	The Marksman	Hargreaves	direct-to-DVD
2005	Submerged	Doc Shock	direct-to-DVD
2003	Michel Vaillant	Steve Warson	
2002	AKA	Benjamin	
2000	The Last of the Blonde Bombshells	Al (billed as Peter Youngblood-Hills)	TV movie, a joint project of BBC Films and HBO
2000	The Beach	Zeph	
1998	Hideous Kinky	Hippy	

=== Television ===
Year	Title	Role	Notes
2001	Band of Brothers	Darrell C. ('Shifty') Powers	10 episodes
2006	Foyle's War	James Taylor	1 episode, "Invasion"
