= Michel Vaillant (film) =

- Directed by: Louis-Pascal Couvelaire
- Written by: Luc Besson; Gilles Malençon
- Produced by: Pierre-Ange Le Pogam
- Starring: Sagamore Stévenin; Peter Youngblood Hills; Diane Kruger
- Cinematography: Michel Abramowicz
- Edited by: Hervé Schneid
- Music by: Tim Abbott; Archive
- Release date: 19 November 2003
- Running time: 103 minutes
- Country: France
- Language: French
- Budget: $26 million
- Box office: $7.2 million

Michel Vaillant (also released as Need for Speed) is a 2003 French film starring Sagamore Stévenin and Diane Kruger. It depicts events around the 24 hours of Le Mans race, based largely on a comic about the Michel Vaillant character. The racing sequences were shot during the 2002 24 Hours of Le Mans.

== Plot ==
For decades, Vaillante, run by the Vaillant family, has had a long history of success in various motor racing disciplines. Their most famous driver is Michel Vaillant, son of the team's founder and owner, Henri, and younger brother of the team's manager, Jean-Pierre. One night, Michel's mother Élisabeth has a nightmare of her son's death in an accident at the 24 Hours of Le Mans involving a car bearing the number 13 operated by Leader, a team with which Vaillante had a historic rivalry for more than a quarter of a century. Henri comforts her, assuring that the Vaillante team is not planning to race at Le Mans, that Leader has quit racing for 5 years, and that no one will bother using the number 13 at the race.

Meanwhile, in Canada, Michel and his best friend and teammate, Steve Warson, are both competing in a WRC race. Michel wins the race, which spikes the wrath of Bob Cramer, a ruthless rival driver who was blocked by him during the race. Cramer confronts Michel's co-pilot, David Wood, over the matter. A few days later, Henri announces that the Vaillante team has purchased engines for the upcoming 24 Hours of Le Mans, and that Wood has been promoted to the driver's seat, promising him a seat at Michel's Le Mans car if he does well in the Rally of Italy. During the race in Italy, Cramer forces Wood off the road. Wood's car crashes violently, and he dies after getting caught in the resulting explosion.

At the funeral for David Wood, Michel meets Julie, Wood's wife, who asks him a favor. Michel then convinces his brother to let Julie join the team so she can take her late husband's place. Meanwhile, the Leader team, now under the management of Ruth, the team founder's daughter, returns to racing. They announce that they will race at Le Mans with the number 13, hiring Bob Cramer as one of their drivers. Élisabeth starts to worry that her nightmare may soon become a reality, and unsuccessfully pleads with Henri to withdraw from Le Mans.

At the weekend before the Le Mans race, Ruth, determined to rid the race of Vaillante, has her henchmen tamper with the Vaillante car delivery. Both Vaillante cars are forced to speed through the streets to Le Mans, and they barely make it in time to compete. Infuriated, Ruth decides to kidnap Henri, planning to blackmail Vaillante into losing the race if they wish to have her spare Henri. Michel initially complies, losing a lot of time each lap, but later tells his brother about Ruth's plot to kill their father. Michel is cleared to go out and save his father after having Julie pose as him during the race.

While trying to track his father's location through the GPS in Ruth's car, Michel is caught by Ruth, who gets him to drive the #13 Leader car, posing as Cramer after an accident puts him out of the race. The #10 Vaillante car and the #13 Leader car eventually meet each other on the track and end up colliding violently, just like in Élisabeth's nightmare. Both drivers, revealed to be really Julie and Michel, come out of the wreckage unharmed. Julie and Michel proceed to go with Warson to leave the race and save Henri.

The three manage to go back to the race, but unfortunately, Warson sustains a gunshot wound while fleeing from Ruth's henchmen after rescuing Henri. Michel decides to replace Warson during a pitstop for the #8 Vaillante car, posing as him for the remainder of the race. In the final lap of the race, when it looks like the #22 Leader car is about to win the race, the Vaillante car gets a flat tire. Meanwhile, the Leader car suddenly starts to slow down due to an engine failure, eventually stopping a few metres before the finish line.

The Vaillante car eventually arrives at the final stretch as the Leader car is being pushed toward the finish line by its driver, before proceeding to cross the finish line first, beating the Leader car by a close call. The Vaillante team go on to celebrate their most recent victory, while Ruth stares blankly in defeat.

== Cast ==
- Sagamore Stévenin as Michel Vaillant; the eponymous French racing driver.
- Peter Youngblood Hills as Steve Warson; Michel's American teammate and best friend. He drives the Team Vaillante #8 car in Le Mans with Spangenberg and Kadokawa.
- Diane Kruger as Julie Wood. David's widow who takes his place in the Team Vaillante #10 car at Le Mans.
- Jean-Pierre Cassel as Henri Vaillant; Michel's father and owner of Team Vaillante.
- Béatrice Agenin as Élisabeth Vaillant; Michel's mother.
- Philippe Bas as Jean-Pierre Vaillant; Michel's brother and manager of Team Vaillante.
- Scott Thrun as David Dougherty, Irish driver and one of Michel's teammates.
- Lisa Barbuscia as Ruth; the new owner of Team Leader.
- Agathe de La Boulaye as Gabrielle Spangenberg; a Belgian female driver which drives the Team Vaillante #8 car in Le Mans. Gabrielle in the original comic history is German, but in the film she carries the Belgian flag.
- François Levantal as Bob Cramer; Michel's rival who is responsible for the death of David.
- Stefano Cassetti as Giulio Cavallo; an Italian driver who co-drives the #10 Vaillante with Michel and Julie, he is an original character created for the film.
- Philippe Lellouche as Jose; a Vaillante mechanic.
- Stephane Metzger as Dan Hawkins; the lead driver of the #22 Leader.
- Gary Cowan as Don Payntor; one of Hawkins' co-drivers in car #22.
- Riton Liebman as Riton.
- Peter Hudson as Leader Team Principal.
- Kentaro as Akira Kadokawa, the Japanese driver of the Team Vaillante #8 car. Another original character for the film.

== Soundtrack ==
The soundtrack album for the film was performed by the band Archive, and released on 4 November 2003.

=== Track listing ===
CD1

1. "Le Mans" [4:52]
2. "Bridge Scene" [5:33]
3. "Helicoptere" [6:13]
4. "Come to Me, Pt. 1" [3:14]
5. "Valliant Theme" [3:48]
6. "Nothing" [3:23]
7. "Friend" [4:26]
8. "Nightmare Scene" [3:20]
9. "Leader Theme" [3:36]
10. "Nightmare Is Over" [4:37]
11. "Valliant (Acoustic)" [1:35]
12. "Night Time" [2:11]
13. "Red" [1:27]
14. "Come to Me, Pt. 2" [6:35]

CD2

1. "Opening Credits (Includes Nightmare Scene)" [3:23]
2. "Indian Theme" [1:29]
3. "Calling" [6:46]
4. "Brass Indian" [0:52]
5. "Main Bridge Scene (Including Sound Design)" [3:11]
6. "End of Bridge Scene/Keen for a Dead Child" [2:18]
7. "Falaise" [1:17]
8. "Break In" [0:36]
9. "Chase Scene" [2:16]
10. "Blue Room" [1:27]
11. "Come to Me, Pt. 3" [3:49]
12. "Crash Scene" [2:40]
13. "Hélicoptère" [1:42]
14. "Warm Up/Leader Theme (Strings Version)" [4:06]
15. "Le Mans (End)" [4:30]
16. "Nightmare Is Over (Acoustic Version)" [2:46]

== Production ==
The film was partly shot during the 24 Hours of Le Mans race in June 2002. Event organizers added two cars to the field specifically to accommodate the filming, but the production had to hire six professional drivers to drive the cars during the actual race.

Filming also took place partly in the Orne department, including one scene shot near at La Chapelle-Montligeon.

== Reception ==
The film was poorly received by critics, who felt it didn't honor the widely successful comics it was based on, underdeveloping the main characters and favoring a stylized and advert-like look. However, some of them praised its photography and exciting racing scenes. Despite a strong marketing campaign, it failed to reach 1 million viewers in France.
