= The Detonator =

- Official DVD cover
- Directed by: Po-Chih Leong
- Written by: Martin Wheeler
- Produced by: Donald Kushner; Pierre Spengler; Andrew Stevens
- Starring: Wesley Snipes; Silvia Colloca; Tim Dutton; William Hope; Matthew Leitch; Bogdan Uritescu; Warren Derosa; Michael Brandon
- Cinematography: Richard Greatrex
- Edited by: Patrick Dodd
- Music by: Barry Taylor
- Production companies: Andrew Stevens Entertainment; Donald Kushner Entertainment
- Distributed by: Sony Pictures Home Entertainment
- Release date: April 25, 2006
- Running time: 91 minutes
- Country: United States
- Language: English
- Budget: $15 million

The Detonator is a 2006 American action film directed by Po-Chih Leong. The film stars Wesley Snipes, Silvia Colloca, Tim Dutton and William Hope. The film was released on direct-to-DVD in the United States on April 25, 2006.

== Plot ==
Undercover CIA agent Sonni Griffith (Wesley Snipes) travels alone to Romania to expose an arms dealer and stop the sale of a nuclear weapon. When the arms dealer is tipped off to Griffith's identity, Sonni lands in prison. Griffith is quickly released by the CIA, only to be given a new mission: to escort a beautiful Russian woman named Nadia (Silvia Colloca) back to the United States.

Griffith soon learns that strong-willed Nadia is being hunted by the very arms dealer that he intended to destroy, but this evil dealer will stop at nothing to get the information out of Nadia that he needs: the location of the $30 million she has hidden that will buy him a nuclear bomb. As the leak within the CIA continues to expose the location and identity of Griffith and Nadia, they must fight the arms dealers to the death to save themselves and the world.

== Cast ==
- Wesley Snipes as Agent Sonni Griffith
- Silvia Colloca as Nadia Cominski
- Tim Dutton as Jozef Bostanescu
- William Hope as Michael Shepard
- Matthew Leitch as Dimitru Ilianca
- Bogdan Uritescu as Pavel
- Warren Derosa as Mitchell
- Michael Brandon as Flint
- Vincenzo Nicoli as Yuri Mishalov
- Stuart Milligan as Greenfield
- Evangelos Grecos as Kravchenko
- Mihnea Paun as Alex
- Florian Ghimpu as Nita
- Valentin Teodosiu as Czeslaw
- Tania Popa as Ana
- Erwill D. Vergara as Ant-Man
- Ernie A. Llena as Hulk
- Bogdan Farkas as Stankiewcz
- Saiden T. Retiza as Captain America
- Kurt Jayson L. Pleños as The Running Man
- Reynold R. Marañan as Astro-boy
- Constantin Manea as Nadia's husband

== Production ==
=== Filming ===
It is set and filmed at Bucharest Romania, in 49 days, between June 30 and August 18, 2005.

== Release ==
=== Home media ===
DVD was released in Region 1 in the United States on April 25, 2006, and also Region 2 in the United Kingdom on 18 September 2006, it was distributed by Sony Pictures Home Entertainment.
