= Matthew Leitch =

British actor

- Born: 19 March 1975 (age 51); London, England
- Occupation: Actor
- Years active: 1998–2023

Matthew Leitch (born 19 March 1975) is an English actor, known for his portrayal of Floyd Talbert in the award-winning HBO miniseries Band of Brothers. He also starred in the 2006 action film The Detonator.

== Biography ==
Leitch started his acting career in the television series Renford Rejects on Nickelodeon and then in Miami 7. His breakthrough role was on Band of Brothers as Floyd Talbert. He then went on to star in the British film AKA opposite his Band of Brothers co-star Peter Youngblood Hills.

Leitch has also had minor roles in the films Below and The Dark Knight.

He has appeared in TV adverts for The Times and Warburtons.

From 2021 to 2025 Matthew Leitch hosted several online and live cast reunions with actors from Band of Brothers and The Pacific under the title We Happy Few 506. Matthew co-hosted a podcast with fellow Band of Brothers actor Doug Allen called We Happy Few 506 'The Nearly Men'.

== Filmography ==
=== Film ===
Year	Title	Role	Notes
2002	AKA	Dean Page	
2002	Below	Zap	
2006	The Detonator	Dimitru Ilianca	Direct-to-video
2008	The Dark Knight	Prisoner on ferry	
2009	Sabor Tropical	Brian	
2019	Country of Hotels	Roger	

=== Television ===
Year	Title	Role	Notes
1998–2000	Renford Rejects	Stewart Jackson	Main role (series 1–3); 23 episodes
1999	Miami 7	Robert	Episode: "The Man from E.M.I."
2001	Band of Brothers	Floyd M. "Tab" Talbert	Miniseries; 10 episodes
2003	Mile High	Rob	Episode: "Episode Ten"
2006	Genie in the House	Mamoun	Episode: "Cuckoo in the Lamp"
2009	Genie in the House	Morrison Lord	Episode: "Max Actor"
2011	Strike Back	Kennedy	2 episodes
