= Martin Delaney (actor) =

British actor

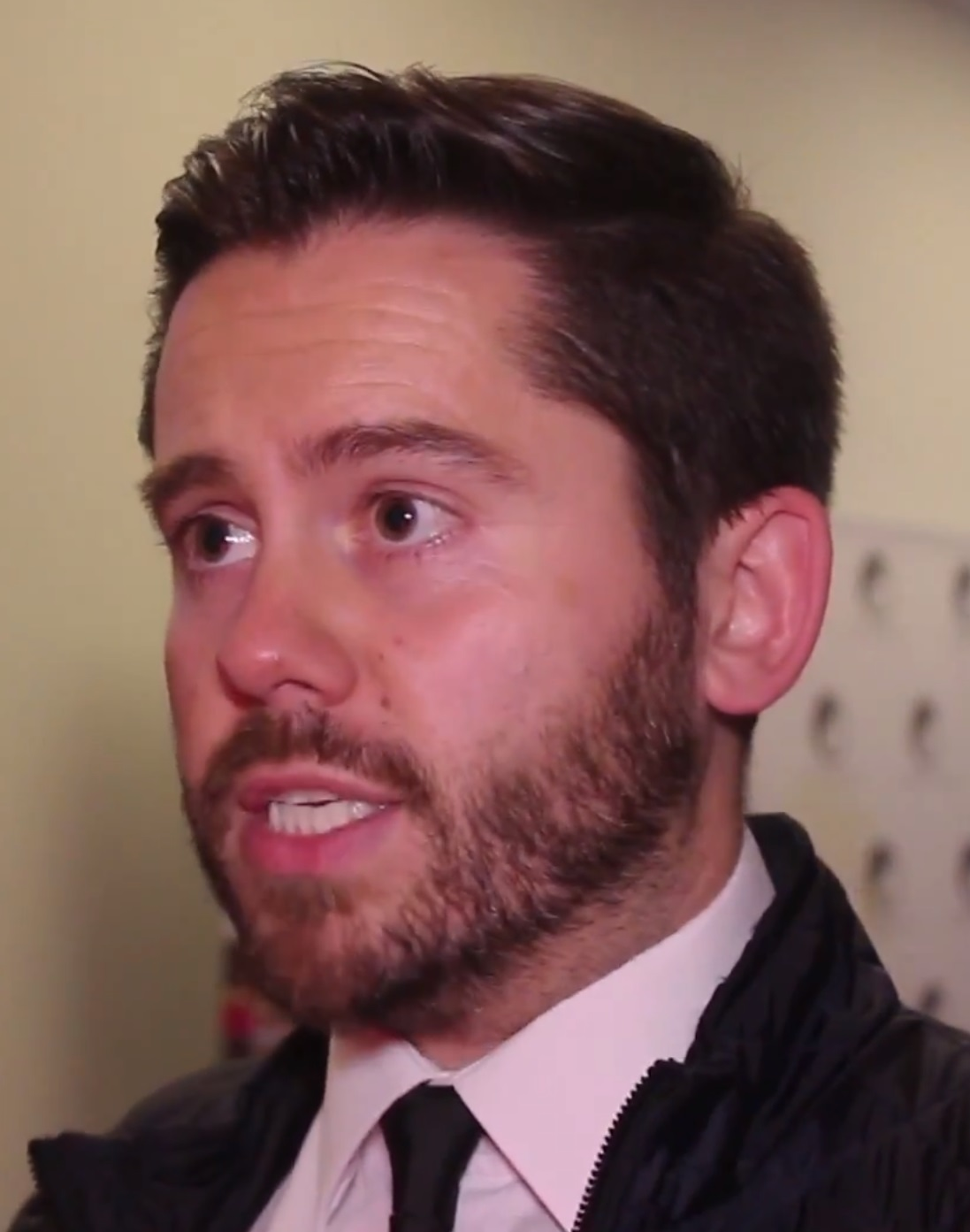
- Delaney in November 2014
- Born: June 1982 (age 43); Kent, England
- Occupations: Actor, filmmaker

Martin Delaney (born 18th June 1982) is an English actor and filmmaker. He has appeared in films such as Zero Dark Thirty, Judas Ghost, and Amar Akbar & Tony.

== Early life ==
Delaney was born in Kent in June 1982, the son of an Irish father and Burmese mother. He is one of four children; his sister Jennie is a singer and performer, while his brothers Mike and Pat are both heavily involved in designing commercials and films for football clubs. He had a Catholic upbringing and attended school in Chislehurst, Kent.

== Career ==
Delaney started work in musical theatre, appearing in Peter Pan - The British Musical and Oliver! Following performances in the West End, Delaney swiftly moved into television with the Nickelodeon series, the Renford Rejects. He played loveable Jason Summerbee, the captain of the useless Soccer team and appeared in the show for 4 years. Renford Rejects was Nickelodeon's first UK project and is considered a classic cult children's sit-com. In 2003, he was employed by the same team that made Renford Rejects to Direct episodes of a children's drama, The A-Z of everything and again in 2010 to direct on a pilot for Disney.

Delaney was nominated for the British Soap Awards for Best Young Actor (in 2000), Best Actor and Best Newcomer (both 2001), for his role of Paul Webb in Family Affairs. Post Family Affairs, he also starred in New Zealand's highest rated home-grown drama, Shortland Street, playing an edgy young chef from Scotland called Samuel Whittaker.

He also briefly starred in sitcom Two Pints of Lager and a Packet of Crisps where he played a stylist from Liverpool. Has appeared in BAFTA winning ‘Him & Her’, as well as ‘JOSH’ for BBC.

Technically he has made three movies in Iceland. He starred in Beowulf and Grendel alongside Gerard Butler and Stellan Skarsgård, he played a US marine in the Clint Eastwood directed, Flags of our Fathers with Ryan Phillippe, both shot on location on the island. He also appeared as himself, lent his voice to and co-produced Wrath of Gods, a feature documentary about the making of Beowulf and Grendel. Wrath of Gods won many awards at a number of film festivals.

He has written Queen’s Mile, a short film which was nominated for Best British Film at BAFTA qualifying Iris Prize in 2016. Other writing includes co-writer of additional material for the British Comedy award nominated, The Kevin Bishop Show, in 2008.

He has made two smaller horror pictures. Stormhouse was released in the UK and the US, in which Delaney plays an American military technician Brandon Faber. In Judas Ghost, he plays the lead Jerry Mackay, leader of a Ghost Finder team in a spin-off feature, to New York Times Best Seller, Simon R. Green's Ghost Finder Series.

In 2012, he appeared in a role in Kathryn Bigelow's Oscar winning film about the hunt for Osama Bin Laden, Zero Dark Thirty and starred 2014 in the Fantasy horror film Judas Ghost.

In 2014 he starred opposite Charlie Condou in "Next Fall" at The Southwark Playhouse in the West End, taking the role of Luke. ‘Next Fall’ is American play set in New York, written by Geoffrey Nauffts. 2014 was the UK debut, following a strong opening on Broadway.

In 2015 British comedy film Amar Akbar & Tony opened to a limited audience in the U.K. it is currently shown on Netflix worldwide. Delaney plays Tony in the film, which has been described as an “homage to Bollywood”. 2016 Delaney played Bo Walsh in John M. Chu’s sequel, Now You See Me, Now You See Me 2. He also starred in the sequel to crime thriller Bonded by Blood, Bonded by Blood 2, which focuses on the new generation involved in the Essex gang-wars.

In 2026 he appeared in an episode of BBC1 drama "Call The Midwife" playing DI Holbrook.

== Filmography ==
=== Film ===
Year	Title	Role	Notes
1996	Gadgetman	Bean McNeil	TV movie
2005	Beowulf and Grendel	Thorfinn	
2006	Flags of our Fathers	Marine at Cave	
2006	Wrath of Gods	Self	Short, Documentary
2011	Stormhouse	Brandon Faber	
2012	Zero Dark Thirty	Assistant to National Security Advisor	
2013	Judas Ghost	Jerry Mackay	
2016	Now You See Me 2	Bo Walsh	
2020	Officer Down	Alex Trent	Short film

=== Television ===
- Renford Rejects as Jason Summerbee
- Family Affairs as Paul Webb
- Shortland Street as Samuel Whitaker
- Two Pints of Lager and a Packet of Crisps
- Rock and Chips
- Robin Hood as Tiernan McMurrough
- Teenage Kicks as Damien
- Victoria Cross Heroes Lt. Ian Fraser
- Him & Her
- The Promise
- The Shadow Line
- Pie in the Sky Benjamin Oates
