= Karolina Lewicka =

Polish-Canadian filmmaker

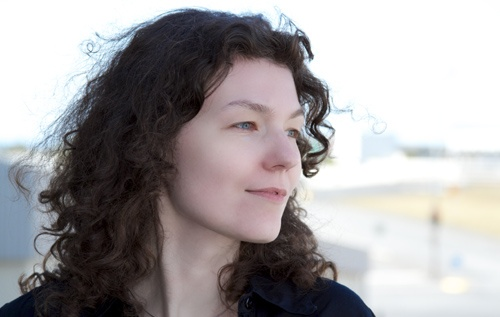
- Born: Poland
- Occupations: Film producer, film director, screenwriter
- Website: http://www.karolinalewicka.com

Karolina Lewicka is a Polish-Canadian director, writer and producer for Artio Films. Karolina graduated from The Poznan University of Economics in Poland. She also studied business at The University of Toronto in Canada. She co-wrote and co-produced an award-winning documentary Wrath of Gods directed by Jon Gustafsson. The film is an Icelandic–Canadian co-production and was financed with participation of the Icelandic Film Fund and Canadian Broadcasting Corporation. The documentary was screened at numerous film festivals around the world, including USA, Portugal, UK and Poland, and received six awards. It was broadcast on RUV in Iceland and CBC Television in Canada. In 2008, Karolina was chosen to participate at the Berlinale Talent Campus. In 2011, she directed her first short film is entitled In a Heartbeat. In a Heartbeat has been invited to eighty film festivals in numerous countries and has won several awards, including Best Short Film in Uruguay and India and Best Original Music in Spain. In a Heartbeat was nominated for the Icelandic Film and Television Academy Awards in 2011. Karolina Lewicka co-wrote and co-directed the feature film Shadowtown with Jon Gustafsson.

== Awards ==
- Best Short Film - In A Heartbeat - International Children's Film Festival Bangalore 2011
- Best Live Action Short Film – Children’s Film Festival Seattle
- Best Live Action – Narrative Short – Platinum Remi – 46th WorldFest Houston, USA
- Best Live Fiction – 3rd award – CineChildren International Film Festival, Italy
- Best Short Film – 7th International Children’s Film Festival 2012 – Bengaluru, India
- Best International Short FICSAM Fest. Inter. Cinema e Saúde Mental in Faro, Portugal
- Best Fiction Short Film – Divercine Film Festival For Children, Montevideo, Uruguay
- Best Original Score – Filmets – Badalona Film Festival, Spain
- Honorable Mention - Columbus International Film + Video Festival, Ohio 2011
- Nominated for Best Short Film – Icelandic Film and Television Academy Awards – Edda Awards
- Nominated for Best Short Film – Carrousel International du Film de Rimouski, Quebec, Canada
