= Beowulf & Grendel =

2005 film by Sturla Gunnarsson

- Theatrical release poster
- Directed by: Sturla Gunnarsson
- Written by: Andrew Rai Berzins
- Produced by: Paul Stephens; Eric Jordan; Sturla Gunnarsson; Jason Piette; Michael Cowan; Anna María Karlsdóttir
- Starring: Gerard Butler; Stellan Skarsgård; Ingvar Sigurðsson; Sarah Polley; Eddie Marsan; Tony Curran; Ronan Vibert; Rory McCann; Martin Delaney
- Cinematography: Jan Kiesser
- Edited by: Jeff Warren
- Music by: Hilmar Örn Hilmarsson
- Distributed by: Truly Indie
- Release dates: 14 September 2005 (Toronto International Film Festival); 10 March 2006 (Canada)
- Running time: 102 minutes
- Countries: Canada; Iceland; United Kingdom
- Language: English

Beowulf & Grendel is a 2005 Canadian-Icelandic fantasy adventure film directed by Sturla Gunnarsson, loosely based on the Anglo-Saxon epic poem Beowulf. It stars Gerard Butler as Beowulf, Stellan Skarsgård as Hrothgar, Ingvar Eggert Sigurðsson as Grendel and Sarah Polley as the witch Selma. The screenplay was written by Andrew Rai Berzins. The soundtrack was composed by Hilmar Örn Hilmarsson.

The film was a cooperative effort among Eurasia Motion Pictures (Canada), Spice Factory (UK), and Bjolfskvida (Iceland), and it was filmed in Iceland.

In 2006, a documentary of the difficult making of Beowulf & Grendel, called Wrath of Gods, was released and went on to win six film awards in Europe and the U.S.

== Setting ==
While some of the film remains true to the original poem, other plot elements deviate from it: four new characters (Grendel's father, the witch Selma, Father Brendan, and Grendel's son) are introduced, and several related plot points were developed specifically for the film.

The story takes place in the early half of the 6th century CE in what is now Denmark, but the filming of the movie in Iceland provided many panoramic views of that country's landscape.

== Plot ==
In 500 CE, Hrothgar, king of Denmark, and a group of warriors chase a large and burly man, whom they consider a troll, and his young son, who already bears cheek and chin whiskers, to the edge of a steep seaside cliff. The father directs his young son, Grendel, to hide from the attackers' view; whereupon The Danes shoot the father dead, and his dead body plunges onto the beach far below. The Danish king sees the young Grendel, but spares him. Later, Grendel finds his father's body and cuts the head off to take it home. Many years later, the severed (and mummified) head is inside a cave, apparently the centerpiece of a primitive memorial. The boy Grendel has now become as large and powerful as his father, and contemplating the head, he plans revenge.

When Hrothgar finds twenty of his warriors killed inside his great hall, the Danish king falls into a depression. Beowulf, with the permission of Hygelac, king of Geatland, sails to Denmark with thirteen Geats to slay Grendel for Hrothgar. The arrival of Beowulf and his warriors is welcomed by Hrothgar, but the king's village has fallen into a deep despair and many of the pagan villagers convert to Christianity at the urging of an Irish monk. While Grendel does raid Hrothgar's village during the night, he flees rather than fight. Selma the witch tells Beowulf that Grendel will not fight him because Beowulf has committed no wrong against him.

A villager, recently baptized and thus now unafraid of death, leads Beowulf and his men to the cliff above Grendel's cave. However, the Geats do not enter, having no rope to climb down the cliff. When the villager is found dead, Beowulf and his men return with a rope and gain entry to Grendel's secret cave, where one of Beowulf's men mutilates the mummified head of Grendel's father. That night, Grendel invades Hrothgar's great hall, kills the Geat who desecrated his father's head, and leaps from the second story, but is caught in a trap by Beowulf. Grendel, refusing capture, escapes by severing his captive arm. He flees to the beach and collapses into the water, where his body is claimed by a mysterious webbed hand. Thereafter Hrothgar admits to Beowulf that he had killed Grendel's father for stealing a fish but had spared the child Grendel out of pity. Grendel's severed arm is kept by the Danes as a trophy. In revealing more about Grendel, Selma recounts that Grendel had once had sex with her and has protected her since that day from the villagers who had raped her on several occasions before; Beowulf becomes her paramour. The Geats and Danes proceed to nail Grendel's arm to the rafters of the hall as a trophy.

At night, the Danes are later attacked by Grendel's mother, the Sea Hag, who kills some men and reclaims her son's arm. Beowulf and the Geats return to Grendel's cave a third time to investigate. They find an underwater passage hidden in a pond within the cave. Beowulf dives through this passage and find Grendel's body in the cave on the other end. When examining the body, he is suddenly attacked by the Sea Hag and slays her with a sword from among her treasure. He then notices that the battle had been observed by the child of Grendel and Selma. Later Beowulf, with Grendel's son watching, buries Grendel and his mother the Sea Hag with ceremony. Shortly thereafter, Beowulf and his band of Geats leave Denmark by ship, having warned Selma that she must hide her son, lest the Danes destroy him.

== Cast ==
- Gerard Butler as Beowulf
- Stellan Skarsgård as Hrothgar
- Ingvar E. Sigurðsson as Grendel
  - Hringur Ingvarsson as Young Grendel
- Sarah Polley as Selma
- Eddie Marsan as Father Brendan
- Tony Curran as Hondscioh
- Ronan Vibert as Thorkel
- Rory McCann as Breca
- Martin Delaney as Thorfinn
- Spencer Wilding as Grendel's Father
- Gunnar Eyjólfsson as Aeschere
- Philip Whitchurch as Fisherman
- Mark Lewis as Hygelac
- Elva Ósk Ólafsdóttir as Sea Hag
- Ólafur Darri Ólafsson as Unferth
- Steinunn Ólína Thorsteinsdóttir as Wealhtheow
- Gísli Örn Garðarsson as Erik
- Gunnar Hansson as Grímur
- Benedikt Clausen as Selma's Child
- Steindór Andersen as Snorri
- Matt John Evans as Geat Warrior #1
- Jon Gustafsson as Geat Warrior #2
- Þröstur Leó Gunnarsson as Guard
- Arnór Hákonarsson as Kid #1
- Thórdur Helgi Gudjónsson as Kid #2
- Kristín Gunnarsdottir as Dead Woman
- Ólafur Egill Ólafsson as Necrophile
- Helgi Björnsson as Man

== Reception ==
On review aggregator Rotten Tomatoes, Beowulf & Grendel holds an approval rating of 47%, based on 34 reviews, and an average rating of 5.42/10. Its consensus reads, "Despite the impressive Icelandic scenery, Beowulf & Grendel fails to find its footing in the transition from epic tale to the big screen." On Metacritic, the film has a weighted average score of 53 out of 100, based on 16 critics, indicating "mixed or average reviews".

Todd McCarthy of Variety stated that the film was "too genteel" in spite of its impressive cinematography and believability. Mick LaSalle from The San Francisco Chronicle felt that, by attempting to make the classic legend a morality tale, it lessened the film's impact, also criticizing Polley as being miscast. The New York Times's Manohla Dargis gave the film two out of four stars, commenting that, while it featured excellent cinematography and production values, the film was undone by its reinterperatation of Grendel and removal of all the mystical elements of the original story. Nick Schager of Slant Magazine offered similar criticism, stating that the film "fail[ed] to generate a requisite degree of mythic grandeur" which greatly diminished the scope and power of the original epic. Schager also criticized the film's added vulgarity, and Polley's casting.

The film was not without its supporters: Entertainment Weekly's Lisa Schwarzbaum commended the film for its naturalistic approach, and its direction.
