= Artio Films =

Icelandic film production company

- Company type: Private
- Industry: Motion pictures
- Founded: 2006
- Headquarters: Reykjavík, Iceland
- Key people: Jon Gustafsson
- Products: Motion pictures television programs film distribution
- Website: www.artiofilms.com

Artio Films is an Icelandic film production company founded in 2006 by Jon Gustafsson. Artio Films produces documentaries, feature films, short films and commercials. Artio Films has produced commercial projects for Icelandic companies, Animal Planet, CBC Television, Reuters and Associated Press.

== Films ==
Among the films produced by Artio Films are Wrath of Gods, an award-winning documentary featuring Gerard Butler, Tony Curran, Rory McCann and Sturla Gunnarsson, and the award-winning short film "In A Heartbeat".
