= RCAF Station Macdonald =

Former air training station in Manitoba

- Near MacDonald, Manitoba in Canada

Site information
- Operator: Formerly Royal Canadian Air Force

Location
- Location within Manitoba

Site history
- In use: 1941-5, 1951-63

Garrison information
- Occupants: No. 3 Bombing and Gunnery School(1941-1945); No.2 Advanced Flying School (1951-2); No.1 Air Gunnery School (1951-4); No.1 Pilot Weapons School (1954-6); No.4 Advanced Flying School (1956-9)

Airfield information
- Identifiers: IATA: none, ICAO: none
- Elevation: 830' AMSL
Runways
Direction	Length and surface
12/30	6500' Hard Surface
2/20	3700' Hard Surface
8/26	2760' Hard Surface

RCAF Station Macdonald was a RCAF air training station located 16 km (10 mi) northwest of Portage la Prairie, Manitoba.

== History ==
=== World War II (1941-1945) ===
The station was built by the Royal Canadian Air Force and opened 10 March 1941. It was the home station for No. 3 Bombing & Gunnery School a unit of the British Commonwealth Air Training Plan.

It was located close to Lake Manitoba so its bombing and gunnery ranges would be over water. RCAF Station Macdonald was equipped with hangars, asphalt runways, H-hut barracks blocks, mess halls, a recreation centre and a base theatre.

The school and the station closed on 17 February 1945.

==== Aerodrome information ====
In approximately 1942 the aerodrome was listed at 50°05′N 98°27′W with a Var. 11 degrees E and elevation of 830'. 3 runways were listed as follows:

Runway Name	Length	Width	Surface
12/30	6500'	150'	Hard surfaced
2/20	3700'	150'	Hard surfaced
8-26	2760'	150'	Hard surfaced

=== Cold War (1951-1963) ===
Royal Canadian Air Force Station Macdonald re-opened in 1951 as the home of No. 4 Advanced Flying School and No. 1 Air Gunnery School, but was re-designated 2 years later as No. 1 Pilot Weapons School until 1954. The school utilized the North American Harvard Mk.II and North American P-51 Mustang aircraft for air-to-air gunnery and air-to-ground rocket training.

RCAF Station Macdonald was a gunnery base for T-33s, who fired their 50mm (2)guns, practice bombs or rockets 5 inch HVAR or 2.75" AAFF into the nearby range at Langruth MB or in the air on a tow target pulled by a T-33 (equipped with day-glo orange tiptanks). To accommodate the jet fighters, runway 12/30 was lengthened to 6500 feet during the re-opening of the station.

Married quarters were added for station personnel and their families. They were simple two unit metal affairs with no basements. As these were small in number, a system of points were used to access them. These points were based on years of service, rank and number of dependents. One started on an unprotected waiting list that one could be "bumped" in ranking if someone had higher point. Once one reached the top of the "unprotected list" and a PMQ became available one advanced to a "protected list" that one could not be bumped...and one waited their turn. Many who were "posted" to Macdonald had to leave their families at their previous base or seek civilian housing as they waited for base housing.

RCAF Station Macdonald closed in 1959 and became a storage depot until 1963 when the Depot closed.

=== Post closure (1963-present) ===
The property was then sold for farming. In 2013 it is known as "Airport Colony Farm".

The airfield was located at 50°04′49″N 098°27′21″W.

== Notable members ==
- Andrew Mynarski, VC, trained here as an air gunner during 1942.
