= The Man Inside (2012 film) =

- Film poster
- Directed by: Dan Turner
- Written by: Dan Turner
- Starring: Michelle Ryan; David Harewood; Peter Mullan
- Release date: 27 July 2012
- Country: United Kingdom
- Language: English

The Man Inside is a 2012 British boxing film written and directed by Dan Turner.

== Plot ==
A young boxer tries to distance himself from his father's criminal past.

== Soundtrack ==
Song	Details	Label	
Song	Details	Label	Ref
GRiM	Bashy Featuring JME & Donaeo: Released: 2012; Format: Digital download	Zephron/ Ragz2Richez Entertainment	
Camourflage	Ten Dixon: Released: 2012; Format: Digital download	That SP Studios /Scanner Rhodes	
