= Victoria Cross Heroes =

2005 British documentary-drama series

- Genre: Docudrama
- Written by: Nicholas White; Steven Clarke; Mary McMurray
- Directed by: Nicholas White; Steven Clarke; Mary McMurray
- Presented by: Charles, Prince of Wales
- Starring: Martin Delaney; Tom Hiddleston; Chris Rankin
- Voices of: Crispin Bonham-Carter
- Narrated by: Kenneth Cranham
- Composer: Tom Escott
- Country of origin: United Kingdom
- No. of episodes: 3

Production
- Executive producers: Peter Georgi; Mark Souster
- Producer: Steven Clarke
- Running time: 60 minutes

Original release
- Network: Five
- Release: 19 November – 3 December 2006

Victoria Cross Heroes is a three-part television UK docudrama recipients first broadcast by Channel 5 in 2006 that tells the stories of some of the recipients of the Victoria Cross.

== Production ==
The series was commissioned to celebrate the 150th anniversary of the Victoria Cross in 2006.

It was produced in association with Lord Ashcroft and the Ashcroft VC Collection, which is the largest collection of its kind in the world.

Former British soldier and noted military historian Richard Holmes acted as historical advisor to the series.

== Episodes ==
=== Episode one: The Modern Age ===
The Prince of Wales introduces the stories of some of the servicemen who have been awarded the Victoria Cross through the 60 years from World War II to the Iraq War, including the most recent recipient, Private Johnson Beharry.

- Royal Canadian Air Force Pilot Officer Andrew Mynarski lost his life attempting to rescue his friend from a burning Avro Lancaster.
- British Army Captain John Randle lost his life taking an enemy bunker at the Battle of Kohima.
- Royal Navy mini-submarine commander Lieutenant Ian Fraser and diver James Magennis destroyed an enemy cruiser.
- British Army Private Bill Speakman was wounded leading charges to hold back an advancing enemy platoon in Korea.
- Gurkha Rifles Lance Corporal Rambahadur Limbu captured enemy prisoners in a nighttime raid in Sarawak.
- Australian Army Training Team Warrant Officer Keith Payne was wounded covering the retreat of a native unit in Vietnam.
- British Parachute Regiment Lieutenant Colonel 'H'. Jones and Sergeant Ian McKay lost their lives in assaults against enemy positions during the Falklands War.
- British Army Private Johnson Beharry was wounded rescuing the crew of his Warrior in two separate ambushes in Iraq.

==== Performers ====
- Crispin Bonham-Carter as Voice of the Gazette
- Peter Ormond as Pat Brophy
- Andy Pilgrim as Andrew Mynarski
- Tom Hiddleston as John Randle
- Martin Delaney as Ian Fraser
- Rob William as James Magennis
- Frank McCusker as Voice of James Magennis
- Yo Santhaveesuk as Rambahadur Limbu
- Andrew Josh as Machine Gunner
- Alex Liang as Machine Gunner
- David Seymour as Ian McKay
- James Hayward as Lt. Bickerdyke

==== Participants ====
- Lord Ashcroft, KCMG
- Johnson Beharry, VC (Iraq, 2005)
- Major Alastair Brooks, MC
- Richard Deane, MC
- Dave Falconer, MC
- Richard Holmes, CBE, TD, JP
- Rambahadur Limbu, VC, MVO (Borneo, 1965)
- Jim Magennis (Son of James Magennis, VC)
- Kit Maunsell, MC
- Freda McKay (Mother of Ian McKay, VC)
- Keith Payne, VC, OAM (Vietnam, 1969)
- John Randle (Son of John Randle, VC)
- Frankie Randle (Grandson of John Randle, VC)
- Bill Speakman, VC (Korea, 1951)

=== Episode 2: The Great War ===
Charles, Prince of Wales, introduces the stories of some of the servicemen who were awarded the Victoria Cross during World War I when over 630, nearly half of all the awards ever given, were earned.

- Royal Fusiliers Lieutenant Maurice Dease and Private Sid Godley defended Nimy Bridge from invaders at Mons, Belgium.
- Indian Army Lieutenant Jackie Smyth carried ammo to a captured enemy trench in France.
- Australian Imperial Force Lance Corporal Albert Jacka single-handedly recaptured a trench during the Battle of Gallipoli.
- Royal Navy Commander Loftus Jones and Boy (First Class) Jack Cornwell lost their lives at the Battle of Jutland.
- Royal Irish Rifles Private Billy McFadzean sacrificed his life jumping on an accidentally dropped grenade at the Battle of the Somme.
- Medical Officer Captain Noel Chavasse awarded double VC rescuing wounded from battlefields at the Somme and Passchendaele.
- Royal Flying Corps fighter pilot Lieutenant William Leefe-Robinson shot down a Zeppelin in an aerial battle over London.
- British Army Lieutenant Colonel Wilfrith Elstob lost his life defending the Manchester Redoubt to the last man.

==== Performers ====
- Crispin Bonham-Carter as Voice of the Gazette
- Felix Scott as Sid Godley
- Ifan Meredith as Noel Chavasse
- Tony Bignell as Jack Cornwell
- William de Coverly as Jackie Smyth
- Mackenzie Scott as Albert Jacka
- Gino Fiorellino as Loftus Jones
- Tom Davey as William Leefe-Robinson
- Anthony English as Stretcher Bearer
- Steven Shapland as Chaplain
- Jeremy Gardiner as Doctor
- Richard Ingram as Wilfrith Elstob

==== Participants ====
- Richard Holmes, CBE, TD, JP (Historian)
- Michael Naxton (Curator, The Ashcroft VC Collection)

=== Episode 3: The Empire ===
The Prince of Wales, introduces the stories of some of the servicemen who have were awarded the Victoria Cross during the early years from its introduction by Queen Victoria during the Crimean War as a democratic award open to all soldiers for extreme acts of bravery to the Boer War when it had been recognised as the most famous gallantry award in the world.

- Royal Navy Captain William Peel and Midshipman Edward St John Daniel distinguished at the Siege of Sebastopol among first recipients.
- British Army Lieutenant William Raynor and John Buckley defended the Red Fort during the Siege of Delhi.
- Royal Navy Able Seaman William Hall single-handedly operated the cannon that breached the walls at the Siege of Lucknow.
- British cavalry officer Evelyn Wood who had fought alongside Peel and Daniel rescued a British informer from captors in India.
- Valentine Bambrick falsely accused of stealing a colleague's medals commits suicide prior to having his own VC stripped.
- British Army Lieutenant John Chard, Private Harry Hook and Private Fred Hitch defended the station at Rorke's Drift.
- Captain Harry Schofield, Lieutenant Freddie Roberts, Captain Walter Congreve and Private George Ravenhill rescued field artillery at the Battle of Colenso.

==== Performers ====
- Phil Lowes as Lt. Freddie Roberts
- Alan Larsen as Cpt. Harry Schofield
- Mark Selwood as Cpl Nurse
- David Bark-Jones as Peel
- Dominic Borrelli as Hook
- Roderic Culver as Chard
- Simon Delaney as Hitch
- Jamie Piggott as Daniel
- Chris Rankin as Wood

==== Participants ====
- Richard Holmes, CBE, TD, JP (Historian)
- Michael Naxton (Curator, The Ashcroft VC Collection)

== Companion book ==
The 2006 companion book to the series written Lord Ashcroft tells the stories of over 150 VC winners individuals whose medals are in his collection and those whose stories feature in the television series with each chapter covering on a different conflict.

=== Selected editions ===
- Ashcroft, Michael (6 November 2006). Victoria Cross Heroes: Men of Valour. Headline Book Publishing (hardcover). ISBN 978-0-7553-1632-8.
- Ashcroft, Michael (3 May 2007). Victoria Cross Heroes: Men of Valour. Headline Review (paperback). ISBN 978-0-7553-1633-5.
