= Amar Akbar & Tony =

- Poster
- Directed by: Atul Malhotra
- Written by: Atul Malhotra
- Produced by: Aayush Puri; Aashreen Puri; Victoria Wood; Atul Malhotra
- Starring: Rez Kempton; Sam Vincenti; Martin Delaney; Vauxhall Jermaine
- Edited by: Gareth Blower
- Production company: Sash Media Productions
- Release date: 17 April 2015
- Country: United Kingdom
- Language: English

Amar Akbar & Tony is a 2015 British comedy-drama film written and directed by Atul Malhotra and starring Rez Kempton, Sam Vincenti and Martin Delaney in the lead roles. Amar Akbar & Tony is an independent British feature film. The title is a play on the 1977 Indian film Amar Akbar Anthony.

== Cast ==
- Rez Kempton as Amar
- Sam Vincenti as Akbar
- Martin Delaney as Tony
- Karen David as Meera
- Laura Aikman as Samantha
- Goldy Notay as Sonia
- Tanveer Ghani as Uncle Jay
- Amrita Acharia as Richa
- Dev Sagoo as Mr Singh
- Munir Khairdin as Southall Sanj
- Manrina Rekhi as Nita
- Kumall Grewall as Mr Khan
- Shide Boss as Nadeem
- Olly Messenger as Kurt
- Maggot as Toilet Attendant
- Kay Aujla as Mrs Singh
- Jean Heard as Emily Williams
- Cloudia Swann as Nicola
- Terry Sue Patt as Priest
- Meera Syal as Honey
- Nina Wadia as Seema
- Ace Bhatti as Doc
- Vauxhall Jermaine as PC Johnson
- Amrit Maghera
- Kumud Pant as CD Stall Man
- Rohan Vij as Amar aged 11
