= Dan Turner (director) =

British film director

- Born: Daniel Edward Turner; Essex, England, United Kingdom
- Occupation: Film director

Daniel Edward Morgan Turner, professionally known as Dan Turner, is a UK-based film director. Born in Essex, Turner excelled at English literature and participated in local theatre. It was not until 2004, after many short films, that Dan first made the feature film Experiment in 2005. He has since directed the 2008 film Look at Me, and the 2009 release Big Mistake.

In 2010 Turner made the horror feature film Stormhouse, which was selected for the Edinburgh Film Festival and Frightfest in London, and in 2011 Dan directed a feature film of his semi-biographical screenplay The Man Inside starring Peter Mullan, David Harewood, Ashley "Bashy" Thomas, Michelle Ryan and Jason Maza.

Turner currently works from Elstree Film studios, on a variety of film and theatre projects.
