= Judas Ghost =

2013 film

- Directed by: Simon Pearce
- Written by: Simon R. Green
- Produced by: Wolfram Parge
- Starring: Martin Delaney; Lucy Cudden; Simon Merrells; Alexander Perkins; Grahame Fox
- Cinematography: Roger Pearce
- Edited by: Simon Pearce
- Release date: November 10, 2013
- Running time: 75 minutes
- Language: English
- Budget: £200,000 (estimated)

Judas Ghost is a 2013 horror film directed by Simon Pearce and written by Simon R. Green based on his Ghost Finders novels.

While based on Green's book series and characters, the film is not a direct adaptation of any specific one of the novels and can be seen as a companion piece to the series overall.

== Plot ==
A team of professional ghost finders are trapped in an old village hall. The haunting they set out to investigate turns out to be far worse than they anticipated. Who will survive and what will be left of their souls?

== Cast ==
- Martin Delaney as Jerry Mackay
- Lucy Cudden as Anna Gilmour
- Simon Merrells as Mark Vega
- Alexander Perkins as Ian Calder
- Grahame Fox as Judas Ghost

== Production ==
=== Writing ===
Ghost Finders was Green's first work to be adapted, but not his first work to be optioned. In an interview with Sachin Trivedi, green said that "I started the ball rolling on the film ‘Judas Ghost’ myself, because I got fed up with seeing my books optioned, but never actually produced".

In the same interview, Green further elaborated on the experience of working on the film:

When I talked to the director Simon Pearce, after the first showing, I paid him the best compliment I could; you made the film I wanted to see... He really nailed the mood and atmosphere, and brought marvellous performances out of the cast. And I have to say, it was a real charge when I visited the set, and saw before me something that had only existed in my imagination before... The real challenge was the budget. Although the basic plot and structure never changed, [the director] kept pressuring me to refine the story, punch up the dialogue, work on the mood and the characters so as to get the maximum impact.
