= Stormhouse =

- Directed by: Dan Turner
- Written by: Jason Arnopp
- Starring: Grant Masters; Katie Flynn
- Release date: 2011
- Running time: 88 min
- Country: United Kingdom
- Language: English

Stormhouse is a 2011 British independent horror film directed by Dan Turner and starring Grant Masters and Katie Flynn.

== Plot ==
Four months before the war in Iraq, a supernatural creature is caught by the United States army and locked in a British military facility. Hayley (Katie Flynn) comes into the facility as a paranormal investigator. She is called in to see if the entity is safely locked away. As the film continues, the entity is released and starts killing people at the facility.

== Reception ==
Paul Doro of Shock Till You Drop said that "Stormhouse is an example of boring mediocrity". Ross Miller of Blogcritics called the film "one of the biggest disappointments of the EIFF 2011". Mac McEntire of DVD Verdict thought that the film "seemed like such a cool idea. Instead, we get…a chain link fence."
