= Battle of Bau =

1965 British-Indonesian battle

- Part of the Indonesia–Malaysia Confrontation
Date	21 November 1965
Location	Bau, Sarawak, Borneo 1°17′38.9″N 111°04′48.6″E
Result	British victory

Belligerents
United Kingdom	Indonesia

Commanders and leaders
Christopher Maunsell	Unknown

Strength
~16 men in advance party, 104 men in main force	~100 men in position, later supported by a full company

Casualties and losses
3 killed; 2 wounded	24 killed

The Battle of Bau, or the Battle of Gunong Tepoi, was an engagement that occurred on 21 November 1965 in the border area of Sarawak in Borneo between British and Indonesian forces. It was part of the wider Indonesian–Malaysian confrontation, that consisted of a series of small-scale engagements involving Indonesia, Malaysia, the United Kingdom, Australia and New Zealand, and which took place over the course of 1962–1966. The engagement involved an attack by a 16-man advance squad of British Army Gurkhas on a company-sized Indonesian position. The Gurkhas were then supported by the 104 men in the rest of the company which resulted in the last Indonesians withdrawing after having virtually been destroyed. The Gurkha company, having suffered relatively light casualties but coming under increasing pressure from another Indonesian company nearby, retired from the position. As a result of the action, one Gurkha—Lance Corporal Rambahadur Limbu—received the Victoria Cross.

== Prelude ==
After relieving the 3rd Battalion, Royal Australian Regiment, in August 1965, the 2nd Battalion, 10th Princess Mary's Own Gurkha Rifles (2/10 PMOGR), under the command of Lieutenant Colonel Peter Myers, had been tasked with reducing a series of Indonesian camps along the Sungei Koemba river, about 5 miles (8.0 km) south of Bau. On 21 November 1965, 'C' Company, under Captain Christopher 'Kit' Maunsell, had been sent out to locate and destroy 'J' Parachute Infantry Battalion that was attempting to establish a base near Serikin in the Bau district of Sarawak, Borneo. Leaving the majority of the company in a harbour, the company commander and a small patrol set out early in the morning, moving through the dense jungle to search for signs of Indonesian infiltration in the area.

== Battle ==
Hearing movement in the dense jungle, the patrol carried out a close reconnaissance which revealed a platoon-sized Indonesian force entrenched on top of a sheer-sided hill, while another group—estimated to be about company strength—was also located about 500 yards (460 m) away to the west on a lower spur. Moving back to the patrol base, Maunsell began giving orders for the company to carry out a deliberate attack on the Indonesian position. Because of the way in which the Indonesians had located their positions, it was necessary for the platoon-sized element on top of the hill to be dealt with first by an advanced party using the element of surprise if possible, so as not to alert the support position before the main assault could be undertaken.

A support position was established about 800 yards (730 m) from the Indonesians, from where the attached forward observer would be able to call in artillery support if required. In addition one platoon was positioned in a location from where they could provide support by fire on to the company-sized position in order to distract them during the initial assault. By noon the battle preparation had been completed and Maunsell led his two assault platoons in single file up the ridge towards the summit. An advance party, consisting of 16 men under the command of Lance Corporal Rambahadur Limbu, led the way, crawling silently up the steep ridge and clearing the way for the rest of the company. It took over an hour to cover the 50 yards (46 m) before the forward machine gun pit was located. The plan was to kill the sentry manning the machine gun silently, however, when the party was 10 yards (9.1 m) from the pit, the sentry spotted them and opened fire, wounding one of the Gurkhas.

Seeing the danger that they were in, Limbu rushed the machine gun and destroyed it with a grenade. Alerted, the rest of the Indonesian platoon began to fire on the forward pit, thus making it an untenable position from which to provide support for the company attack. In order to report this fact to his platoon commander, Limbu exposed himself to enemy fire before returning to his section to continue on with the assault. At the same time, Maunsell had decided to launch the main assault. The lead assault platoon, 8 Platoon, under Lieutenant Ranjit Rai, a Queen's Gurkha Officer, suppressed one of the enemy machine guns before clearing a hut that was located inside the Indonesian position. The Indonesian resistance to the assault was increasing, so Maunsell gave the order for Rai's platoon to carry out an assault on one of the secondary pits. During this assault, one Gurkha was killed and another wounded. However, it proved successful, and Indonesian resistance began to falter.

On the left flank, the second assault platoon, 9 Platoon, began receiving fire from another Indonesian machine gun pit and its advance was halted. Under the cover of fire laid down by a two-man Bren light machine gun crew, Rambahadur Limbu charged the machine gun pit and again silenced it with a grenade. The three men pressed on, jumping over the destroyed gun. However, one of the Indonesians was still alive and fired a burst as the men passed, hitting the Bren crew, before being killed himself by a grenade. Limbu turned back and over the course of twenty minutes—during which he was almost constantly under fire—he proceeded to rescue them both. He carried the first man to shelter in the hut that had been cleared, before going back out to bring back the second. Both soldiers died of their wounds shortly afterward. Limbu returned to retrieve their Bren and provided covering fire to the final stages of the assault. Limbu killed four more Indonesians as they attempted to escape across the border.

After a fire fight that lasted over an hour, the Indonesians were cleared from the top of the hill. However the fire from the company-sized position on the lower spur began to increase and the Gurkhas found themselves under pressure to withdraw. Realising the danger if they remained in the location, Maunsell gave the order to retire and the company began to withdraw from the position. Under the cover of accurate howitzer and mortar fire directed by the Forward Observation Officer, Lieutenant Douglas Fox, C Company was successfully extracted. The column was met by the Medical Officer, Captain Jack Wynters RAMC, who treated the wounded and, while holding the intravenous drip of one, accompanied them on the march back to Serikin in the pitch dark.

== Aftermath ==
After the battle it was estimated that the Indonesians had suffered at least 24 men killed in the action, while the number of wounded remains unknown. Against this, the British lost three men killed and two wounded, one of them seriously. Two of the dead had been the two men that Rambahadur Limbu had attempted to rescue. Nevertheless, for his bravery during the action, Limbu was awarded the Victoria Cross. For their leadership Maunsell, Rai and Fox were all awarded the Military Cross.

== See also ==
- Brigade of Gurkhas
- List of Brigade of Gurkhas recipients of the Victoria Cross
