= Rambahadur Limbu =

Nepalese Gurkha (1939–2023)

Rambahadur Limbu VC MVO
- रामबहादुर लिम्बू
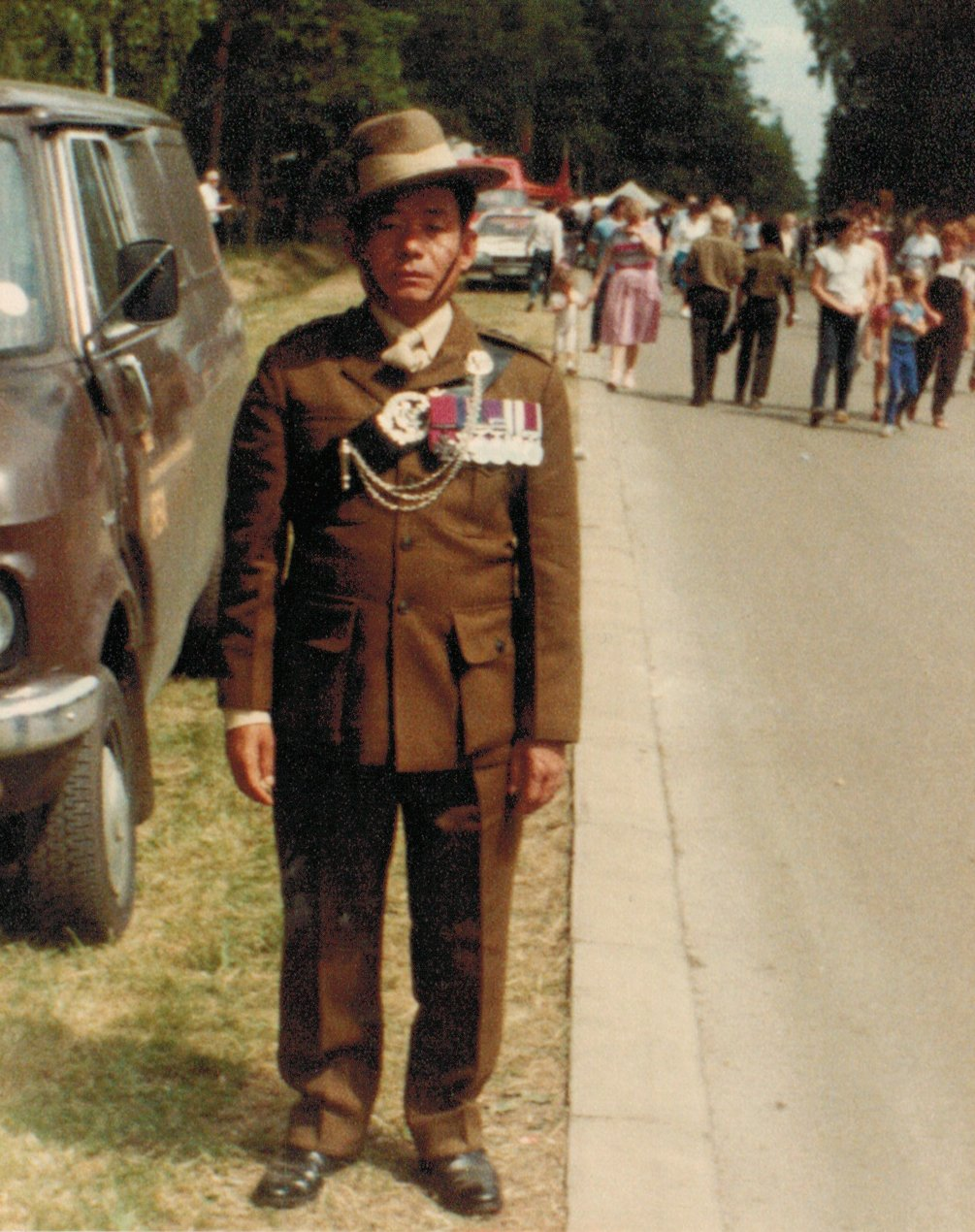
- Limbu in 1984
- Born: 8 July 1939; Chyangthapu, Nepal
- Died: 22 April 2023 (aged 83); Lalitpur, Nepal
- Military career
- Allegiance: United Kingdom
- Branch: British Army
- Service years: 1957–1985
- Rank: Captain
- Service number: 21148786
- Units: 2nd Battalion, 10th Princess Mary's Own Gurkha Rifles
- Conflicts: Malayan Emergency; Indonesia–Malaysia confrontation; Battle of Bau
- Awards: Victoria Cross; Member of the Royal Victorian Order

Rambahadur Limbu, VC, MVO (Nepali: रामबहादुर लिम्बू; 8 July 1939 – 22 April 2023) was a Nepalese Gurkha and recipient of the Victoria Cross, the highest award for gallantry in the face of the enemy that can be awarded to British and Commonwealth forces. Rambahadur Limbu belonged to the Begha Clan of Limbu people of Nepal. Limbu was born in Chyangthapu village, Tehrathum, in East Nepal, and later lived in Damak.

== Military career ==
=== Victoria Cross ===
In November 1965, Limbu was 26 years old, and was a lance corporal in the 2nd Battalion, 10th Princess Mary's Own Gurkha Rifles, British Army during the Indonesian Confrontation. On 21 November in Sarawak, Borneo, Limbu was in an advance party of 16 Gurkhas when they encountered about 30 Indonesians holding a position on the top of a jungle-covered hill. Limbu went forward with two men, but when they were only ten yards from the enemy machine-gun position, the sentry opened fire on them, whereupon Limbu rushed forward and killed him with a grenade. The remaining enemy combatants then opened fire on the small party, wounding the two men with Limbu. Limbu then made three journeys into the open under heavy fire, two to drag his comrades to safety and one to retrieve their Bren gun, with which he charged down and killed many of the enemy.

==== Citation ====
The QUEEN has been graciously pleased to approve the award of the VICTORIA CROSS to:

21148786 Lance Corporal RAMBAHADUR LIMBU, 10th Princess Mary's Own Gurkha Rifles.

On 21 November 1965, in the Bau District of Sarawak, Lance Corporal RAMBAHADUR LIMBU was with his Company when they discovered and attacked a strong enemy force located in the Border area. The enemy were strongly entrenched in Platoon strength, on top of a sheer sided hill the only approach to which was along a knife edge ridge allowing only three men to move abreast. Leading his support group in the van of the attack he could see the nearest trench and in it a sentry manning a machine gun. Determined to gain first blood he inched himself forward until, still ten yards from his enemy, he was seen and the sentry opened fire, immediately wounding a man to his right. Rushing forward he reached the enemy trench in seconds and killed the sentry, thereby gaining for the attacking force a foothold on the objective. The enemy were now fully alerted and, from their positions in depth, brought down heavy automatic fire on the attacking force, concentrating this onto the area of the trench held alone by Lance Corporal RAMBAHADUR LIMBU.

Appreciating that he could not carry out his task of supporting his platoon from this position he courageously left the comparative safety of his trench and, with a complete disregard for the hail of fire being directed at him, he got together and led his fire group to a better fire position some yards ahead. He now attempted to indicate his intentions to his Platoon Commander by shouting and hand signals but failing to do so in the deafening noise of exploding grenades and continuous automatic fire he again moved out into the open and reported personally, despite the extreme dangers of being hit by the fire not only from the enemy but by his own comrades.

It was at the moment of reporting that he saw both men of his own group seriously wounded. Knowing that their only hope of survival was immediate first aid and that evacuation from their very exposed position so close to the enemy was vital he immediately commenced the first of his three supremely gallant attempts to rescue his comrades. Using what little ground cover he could find he crawled forward, in full view of at least two enemy machine gun posts who concentrated their fire on him and which, at this stage of the battle, could not be effectively subdued by the rest of his platoon. For three full minutes he continued to move forward but when almost able to touch the nearest casualty he was driven back by the accurate and intense weight of fire covering his line of approach. After a pause he again started to crawl forward but he soon realised that only speed would give him the cover which the ground could not.

Rushing forward he hurled himself on the ground beside one of the wounded and calling for support from two light machine guns which had now come up to his right in support he picked up the man and carried him to safety out of the line of fire. Without hesitation he immediately returned to the top of the hill determined to complete his self imposed task of saving those for whom he felt personally responsible. It was now clear from the increased weight of fire being concentrated on the approaches to and in the immediate vicinity of the remaining casualty the enemy were doing all they could to prevent any further attempts at rescue. However, despite this Lance Corporal RAMBAHADUR again moved out into the open for his final effort. In a series of short forward rushes and once being pinned down for some minutes by the intense and accurate automatic fire which could be seen striking the ground all round him he eventually reached the wounded man. Picking him up and unable now to seek cover he carried him back as fast as he could through the hail of enemy bullets. It had taken twenty minutes to complete this gallant action and the events leading up to it For all but a few seconds this young Non-Commissioned Officer had been moving alone in full view of the enemy and under the continuous aimed fire of their automatic weapons. That he was able to achieve what he did against such overwhelming odds without being hit is miraculous. His outstanding personal bravery, selfless conduct, complete contempt of the enemy and determination to save the lives of the men of his fire group set an incomparable example and inspired all who saw him.

Finally rejoining his section on the left flank of the attack Lance Corporal RAMBAHADUR was able to recover the light machine gun abandoned by the wounded and with it won his revenge, initially giving support during the later stages of the prolonged assault and finally being responsible for killing four more enemy as they attempted to escape across the border. This hour long battle which had throughout been fought at point blank range and with the utmost ferocity by both sides was finally won. At least twentyfour enemy are known to have died at a cost to the attacking force of three killed and two wounded. In scale and in achievement this engagement stands out as one of the first importance and there is no doubt that, but for the inspired conduct and example set by Lance Corporal RAMBAHADUR at the most vital stage of the battle, much less would have been achieved and greater casualties caused.

He displayed heroism, self sacrifice and a devotion to duty and to his men of the very highest order. His actions on this day reached a zenith of determined, premeditated valour which must count amongst the most notable on record and is deserving of the greatest admiration and the highest praise.

The medal was presented by the Queen in a ceremony at Buckingham Palace in 1966. Limbu's five-year-old son attended with his father.

His original Victoria Cross was stolen, along with all his other possessions, while he was asleep during a train journey in India to his native Nepal in 1967. It has never been found, and he was issued with a replacement.

=== Later career ===
Limbu reached the rank of captain, as a Queen's Gurkha Officer (QGO), and was appointed Member of the Royal Victorian Order (MVO) in 1984 for his service as Queen's Gurkha Orderly Officer. He then retired from active service in 1985.

== Death ==
Limbu died from heart and kidney failure in Lalitpur on 22 April 2023, aged 83.

== In the media ==
Limbu was interviewed for the 2006 television docudrama Victoria Cross Heroes which also included archive footage and dramatisations of his actions.

== Medal entitlement ==
Captain Rambahadur Limbu was entitled to the following medals;

Ribbon	Description	Notes
	Victoria Cross (VC)	1965
	Member of the Royal Victorian Order (MVO)	Member – 1984
	General Service Medal (1918)	1 Clasp: Malaya
	General Service Medal (1962)	2 Clasp: Borneo; Malay Peninsula
	Queen Elizabeth II Silver Jubilee Medal	1977
	Queen Elizabeth II Golden Jubilee Medal	2002
	Queen Elizabeth II Diamond Jubilee Medal	2012
	Queen Elizabeth II Platinum Jubilee Medal	2022
	Long Service and Good Conduct Medal	With Bar "REGULAR ARMY"
	Gurkha Reserve Unit Medal	
	Pingat Jasa Malaysia	2005

== See also ==
- List of Brigade of Gurkhas recipients of the Victoria Cross
