= 10th Princess Mary's Own Gurkha Rifles =

British and British Indian Army unit

- Active: 1890–1994
- Country: India; United Kingdom; Nepal
- Branch: British Army
- Type: Rifles
- Role: Light Infantry
- Size: First battalion (Second: 1903–68, Third: 1940–47, Fourth: 1941–46)
- Garrison/HQ: Quetta; Alhilal; Taiping; Seremban; British Hong Kong
- Colors: Rifle Green Facings, Black Piping, Black Lanyard
- March: Quick: Hundred Pipers
- Engagements: Burma 1885–87; (The Great War): Helles, Krithia, Suvla, Sari Bair, Gallipoli 1915, Suez Canal, Egypt 1915, Sharqat, Mesopotamia 1916–18, Afghanistan 1919 (Second World War): Iraq 1941, Syria 1941, Bologna, Italy 1944–45, Monywa 1942, Tamu Road, Mandalay, Kyaukse 1945, Burma 1942–45

Commanders
- Notable commanders: Brigadier Godfrey Bartlett Proctor

Insignia
- Shoulder Flash
- Abbreviation: 10 GR

The 10th Princess Mary's Own Gurkha Rifles (abbreviated to 10 GR) was originally a rifle regiment of the British Indian Army. The regiment was formed in 1890, taking its lineage from a police unit and over the course of its existence it had a number of changes in designation and composition. It took part in a number of campaigns on the Indian frontiers during the 19th and early 20th centuries, before fighting in the First World War, the Third Anglo-Afghan War and the Second World War. Following India's independence in 1947, the regiment was one of four Gurkha regiments to be transferred to the British Army. In the 1960s it was active in the Malayan Emergency and Indonesian Confrontation. It was amalgamated with the other three British Gurkha regiments to form the Royal Gurkha Rifles in 1994.

== History ==
=== Early history ===
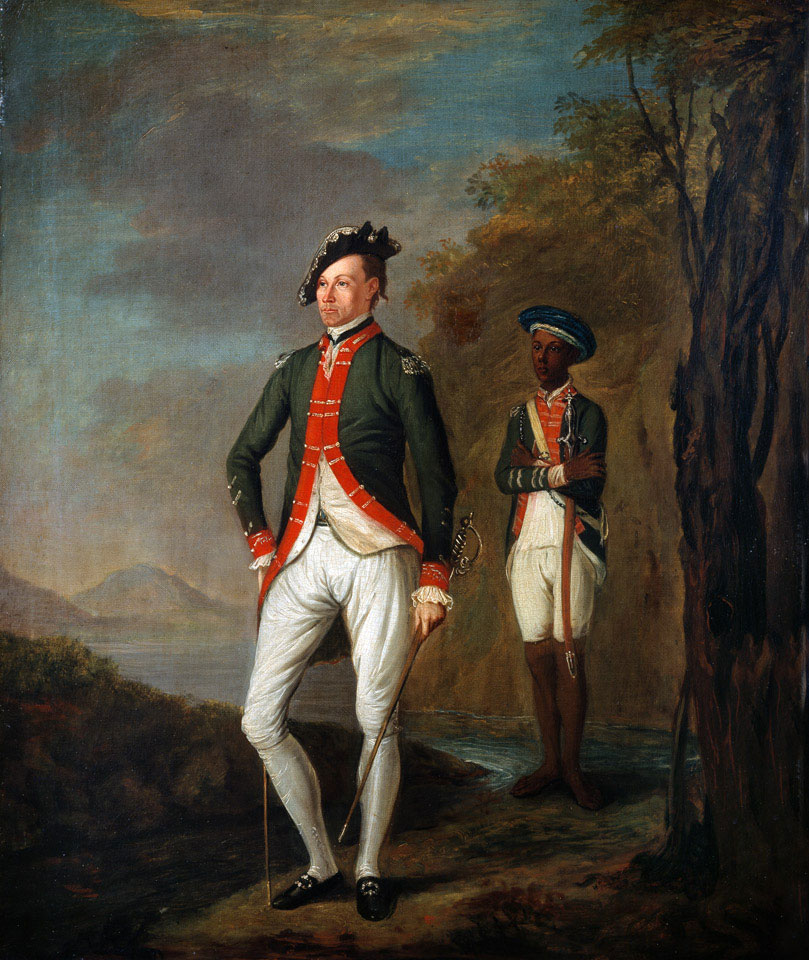
c. 1769 painting of a 14th Battalion of Coast Sepoys captain

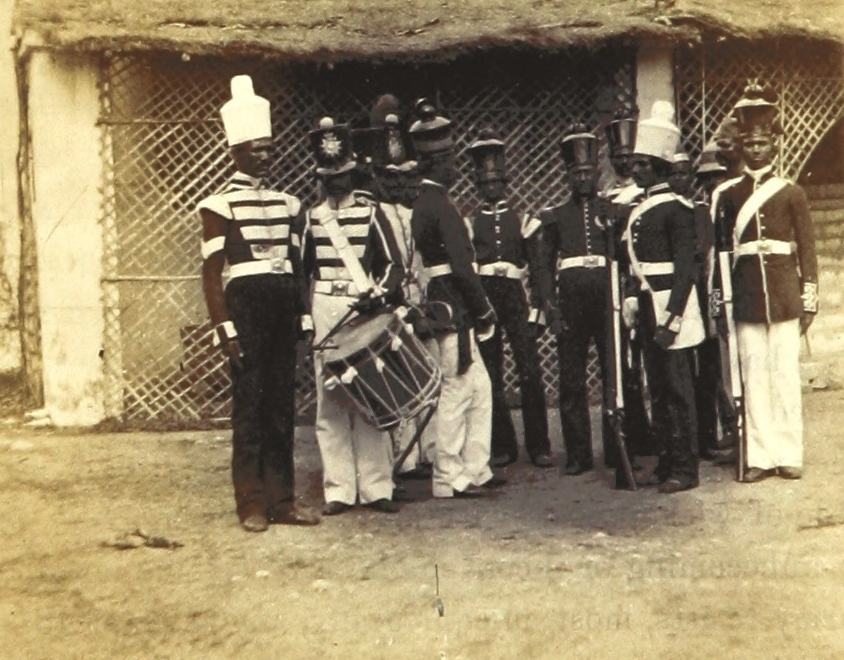
Soldiers of the 10th Regiment of Madras Native Infantry, 1862

At the end of the Third Burmese War in 1887, it was decided to withdraw the regular army battalions and replace them with a freshly recruited military police force. Recruited in India, it was intended that the military police would be a temporary force which would establish order in districts of upper Burma and then hand over those districts to the civil police. The military police would then be used to form additional regular battalions of the Indian Army. The Kubo (Kabaw) Valley Military Police were raised on 9 April 1887 by Sir F.B. Norman (OC Eastern Frontier Brigade) at Manipur in India and was composed in equal numbers of Gurkha and Assam hillmen recruits. The first commander was Lieutenant C.W. Harris. The battalion moved to Burma and was initially stationed at Tamu.

In 1890, it was decided to convert the Kubo Valley Military Police Battalion in Burma into a new battalion with the title of 10th Madras Infantry. The original 10th Madras Infantry, one of the oldest battalions in the Indian Army, had recently been disbanded. The new battalion had no association with the old except for the name. The relics of the battalion were eventually taken back to India.

The 10th Madras Infantry was formed from the Kubo Valley Military Police on 1 June 1890 under the command of Major Macgregor at Mandalay Palace. The battalion did not inherit the precedence or honours of the 10th Madras Infantry at that time, by decision of the army authorities. Their reasoning being that it would be incorrect to give such a new battalion the precedence and honours of one of the oldest battalions in India. But it was also true that the composition of the 10th Madras Infantry had been through similar drastic changes in composition. For example, after the Mahratta wars, its composition was changed from Northern Indian to Southern Indian.

The initial strength of the battalion was three British officers, eight Indian officers and 277 other ranks. It was not at first exclusively Gurkha in composition. The battalion was initially composed of Gurkha detachments transferred from the 42nd, 43rd and 44th Gurkha Rifles, an equal number of men from the hill-tribes of Assam including Jhurwahs, small numbers of Dogras and a few Hindustanis. The non-Gurkhas were gradually wasted out of the regiment.

In its first few years of existence, the regiment was referred to by two different names in the Indian Army Lists. In 1890 it was called the 10th (Burma) Regiment of Madras Infantry and the following year it was called the 10th Regiment (1st Burma Battalion) of Madras Infantry. But in reality, the second name was the one used by the battalion until 1892.

It became the 10th Regiment (1st Burma Rifles) of Madras Infantry on 9 February 1892 at Maymyo in Burma. It was at this time, with the conversion of the unit to a Rifle Regiment, that the old colours of the 10th Madras were taken back to India (rifle regiments do not carry colours) and laid up at the Church of St. John in the fort at Vellore near to where the earliest predecessor of the 10th Madras Infantry had been raised in 1766. On 3 May 1895 the name of the regiment was changed again to 10th Regiment (1st Burma Gurkha Rifles) of Madras Infantry to reflect its now all-Gurkha composition.

On 13 September 1901, as part of a broad reorganisation of the Indian Army, it became the 10th Gurkha Rifles and the regiment maintained its assigned recruiting areas in the Limbu and Rai tribal areas of eastern Nepal. A 2nd Battalion was formed in 1903 although it became the 1st Battalion, 7th Gurkha Rifles in 1907. A new 2nd Battalion of the 10th Gurkha Rifles was formed in 1908. From 1903 to 1912 the first battalion was stationed in Maymyo, Burma as almost a ceremonial unit. In the winter months of 1912 and 1913 the 1st Battalion was sent into the Kachin Hills to guard against a potential uprising that did not occur.

=== First World War ===
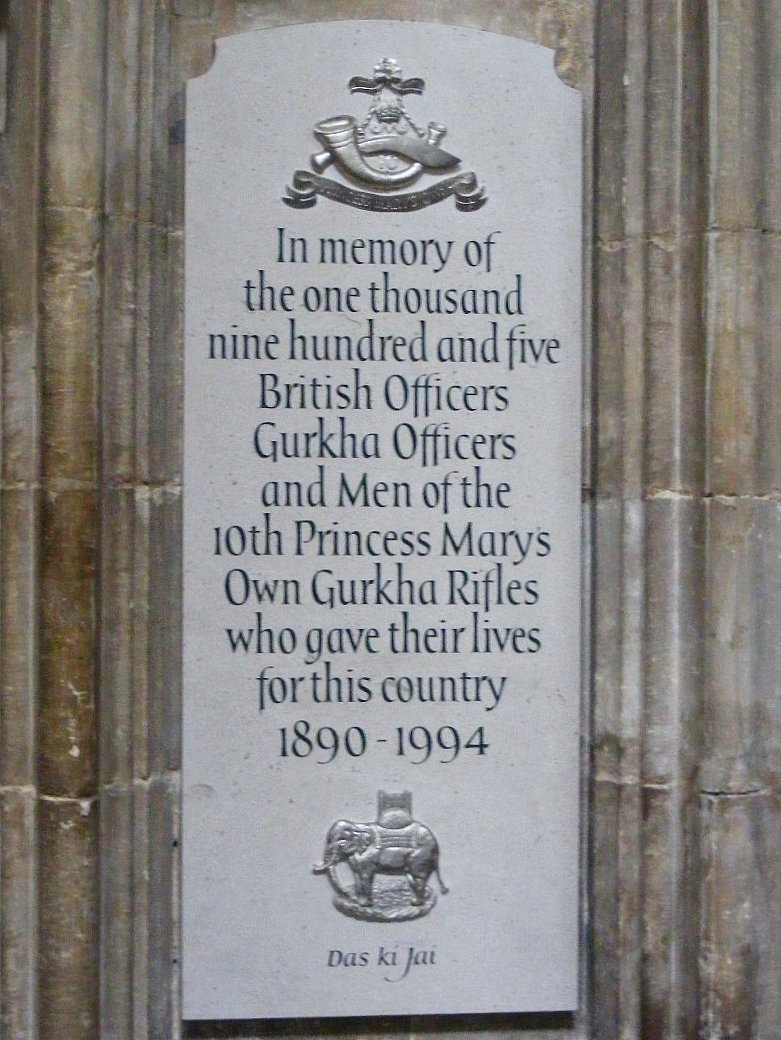
10 GR Memorial in Winchester Cathedral, Hampshire

The First World War between the UK, France and their allies against Germany and its allies, began in August, 1914. The 1st Battalion remained in Burma providing reinforcements and replacements to the 2nd Battalion which was on active service until 1916. At least five drafts were supplied. The third draft was sunk at sea by an Austrian submarine in the Aegean Sea with the loss of 187 men.

The 2nd Battalion fought in the Middle East, against the Ottomans in the Defence of the Suez Canal, Egypt in 1915. The Ottomans had attempted to cross the canal into Egypt but the Allied forces there successfully repulsed the attack, decimating them as they attempted the crossing. As a result of the 2nd Battalion's involvement in this campaign, the regiment gained the battle honour "Suez Canal" and the theatre honour "Egypt 1915".

Later that year the 2nd Battalion, as part of the 29th Indian Brigade, took part in the Dardanelles Campaign against the Ottomans. The brigade had initially been intended to be part of the New Zealand and Australian Division in the landing at Anzac Cove but instead was directed to assist at Cape Helles where the situation was deteriorating since the assault on 25 April. The brigade landed at Cape Helles in early May and the 2nd Battalion took part in the Battle of Gully Ravine which began on 28 June. The brigade as a whole was moved to Anzac Cove in August where it took part in the August Offensive. The 2nd Battalion suffered heavy casualties during its participation in the Gallipoli campaign. The forces at Anzac and Suvla were evacuated in December 1915, although the last British troops did not leave until January 1916, from Helles.

On 15 August 1916 the 1st Battalion embarked from Rangoon for the Middle East after a farewell ceremony given by the Governor of Burma. Both battalions of the regiment fought in Mesopotamia (now Iraq) from 1916, which was then part of the Ottoman Empire, an ally of the Germans. The Mesopotamian campaign had started in 1914. Much of the regiment's involvement in the war was relatively quiet but it did take part in a number of engagements including the offensive against Baghdad in 1917 and the last battle of the Mesopotamian campaign in late October 1918, Sharqat.

The 1st Battalion remained in Mesopotamia upon the conclusion of the war. It saw service during the revolt of Southern Kurdistan in 1919 and the rest of Iraq. Elsewhere, the 2nd Battalion took part in the Third Afghan War in 1919 and in operations in the North-West Frontier.

=== Second World War ===
During the Second World War the regiment raised a further two battalions, the 3rd Battalion in 1940 and the 4th Battalion in 1941.

==== Middle East and Italy ====
A coup in Iraq took place in 1941. An Iraqi military group with ties to Germany deposed the Iraqi Monarchy. As a consequence the British launched an invasion of Iraq to restore the Government, the 2nd Battalion participated as part of the 10th Indian Infantry Division. An Armistice was signed with Iraq after British forces entered the Iraqi capital Baghdad on 31 May and the Iraqi Monarchy was restored, the coup leader Rashid Ali had fled, first to Iran and then to Germany. The battalion later took part in the invasion of Vichy France-controlled Syria later in the year. The battalion took part in the Battle of Deir ez Zor for which the regiment received another battle honour.

The 1st Battalion later took part in operations in Iran and the Italian campaign. In Italy the battalion took part in a number of engagements including at Coriano and Santarcangelo in September 1944 for which the regiment won more battle honours. The battalion saw further service the following year in the tough terrain of Italy. During one incident a patrol of the battalion encountered a German detachment. Close-combat ensued, Rifleman Ganjabahadur Rai charged two Germans, dispatching both with his Kukri. The rifleman was killed shortly thereafter by a number of other Germans. A Kukri-scarred rifle, (belonging to one of the Germans who had attempted to defend himself with it during his encounter with Rifleman Rai), was captured by the Gurkhas and kept as a trophy. Another instance of Gurkhas killing German soldiers with their Kukris, while attached to the 10th Mtn Div (US) in Italy in early 1945, was related by Lieut-Col. E. N. Cory Jr., BC 616th FA (Pack), a mountain artillery battalion. The Gurkhas would stalk pairs of German sentries at night and routinely dispatch the one awake, leaving the sleeping sentry to find his dead comrade. In response, the German command ordered the summary execution of any allied soldier captured with a knife. Accordingly, soldiers of the 10th Mtn Div carried no knives, yet continue to display blood-red crossed-knives as part of their shoulder insignia.

The 2nd Battalion was attached to the 3rd Indian Motor Brigade, then at Shaibah near Basra, in January 1943. It had recently returned from the Western Desert, after having been almost destroyed at the Battle of Gazala in May 1942.

At the end of the month the brigade was renamed the 43rd Indian Infantry Brigade (Lorried). The brigade and its Gurkha battalions were sent to Italy in mid-1944 as an independent formation.

==== Far East ====
The regiment was heavily involved against the Japanese with the 1st, 3rd and 4th Battalions taking part in the Burma Campaign. The Japanese had swiftly invaded British territories in the Far East, including Burma, shortly after they launched the attack on Pearl Harbor on 7 December 1941. The 1st Battalion was rushed to Burma, arriving in March 1942 just a week before the evacuation of Rangoon. The battalion conducted a fighting retreat hundreds of miles overland from Burma, reaching India in May 1942.

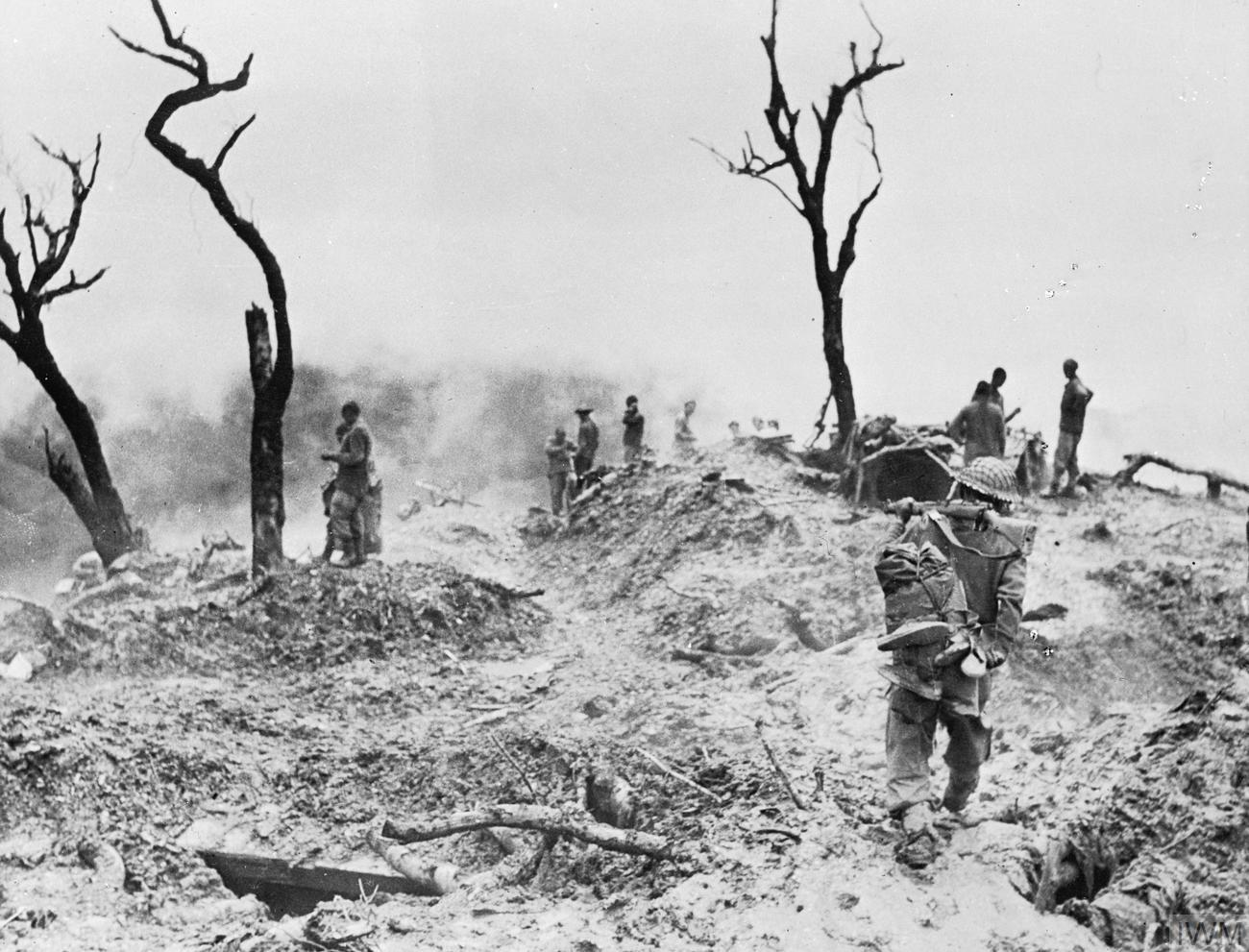
Scraggy Hill (known to the Japanese as Ito Hill) on the Shenam Pass, captured by the 4/10th Gurkhas

From November 1943 to August 1945 the 4th Battalion distinguished itself in the fighting in Burma under 20th Indian Division.

The regiment was heavily involved at Imphal. It was besieged by the Japanese for a number of months, the Allied defenders stoutly resisting all attempts to dislodge them. The siege was eventually lifted after victory at Kohima and Allied forces were soon launching their own offensive into Burma.

During this particular period the 3rd Battalion saw intense fighting at Scraggy Hill and Shenam Pass where the battalion was embroiled in heavy fighting with Japanese forces, the battalion often employing their kukris in fierce hand-to-hand combat against the Japanese.

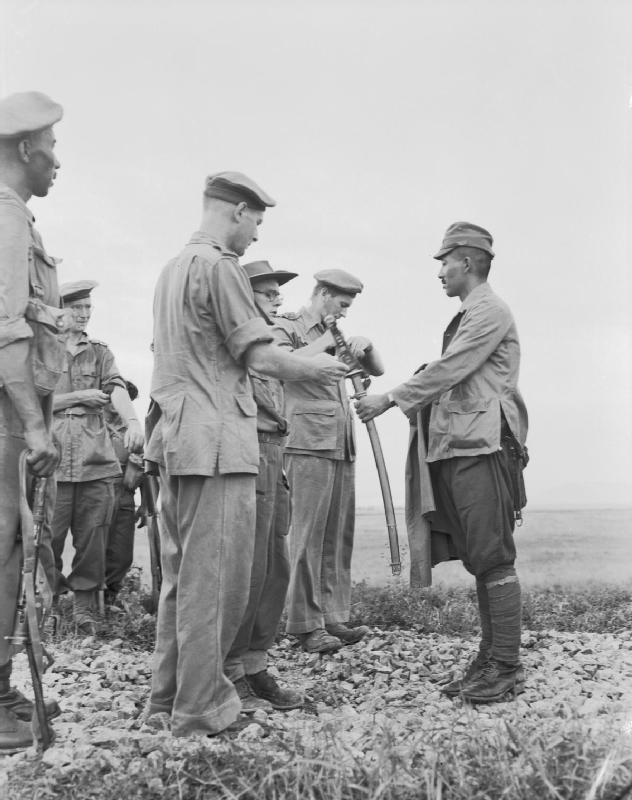
Major Wako Lisanori, Chief of the Japanese XXVIII Army, surrenders to Lieutenant Colonel O. N. Smyth of the 10th Gurkha Rifles.

The Allied offensive was successful, pushing the Japanese forces back into Burma, the regiment took part in many engagements in the country. In 1945 the regiment took part in the effort to capture Mandalay; British forces entered the city on 20 March. The regiment also took part in the capture of Meiktila, which was taken in early March. In that same month the 10th Gurkhas took part in the defence of Meiktila during a Japanese counter-attack which was repulsed by the Allied defenders. The capital Rangoon was liberated by British forces on 3 May. The regiment saw much more action during the latter months of the Burma campaign.

Representatives of the regiment, as with all units that were involved in the Burma campaign, took part in the Victory Parade in Rangoon on 15 June. The 10th Gurkhas accumulated 19 battle honours for their participation in the campaign—including the theatre honour "Burma 1942–45"—the most Battle Honours gained by any unit in the Burma campaign.

The 1st Battalion was given one further duty. It was charged with taking the formal surrender of the 28th Japanese Army in Burma at Paung on 29 October 1945. The ceremony took place with a table covered with the regimental flag, a second banner also flew under the Union Jack.

=== Post-War ===
The 4th Battalion was disbanded in 1946, the 3rd Battalion was disbanded the following year.

India gained independence from the British Empire in 1947. As a consequence of the Tripartite Agreement between India, Nepal and the UK, four of the 10 Gurkha regiments (eight Battalions in all), were transferred to the British Army; the 10th Gurkha Rifles being one of them. It joined the Brigade of Gurkhas which was formed to administer the Gurkha units transferred to the British Army. Before independence, the battalion decided to take the old colours of the 10th Madras Infantry out of India with it. Consideration was given to taking the regimental memorial at All-Saints Church in Maymyo Burma, which had been damaged by the Japanese during the war, but it was decided to leave it behind because of the expense involved and the uncertainty over where it could be relocated. It consisted of marble on the floor of the sanctuary and wooden plaques on the walls.

The 1st Battalion served in Burma after the war and was one of the three battalions attending the independence ceremony in Rangoon in January 1948. It then moved by sea to Malaya.

In 1949 the regiment's name was altered to become the 10th Princess Mary's Own Gurkha Rifles (10 GR) in honour of HRH Princess Mary, Princess Royal. The regiment was affiliated with the Royal Scots (The Royal Regiment), the oldest regiment in the regular army in 1950.

Meanwhile, on operations, the 1st and 2nd Battalions took part in the Malayan Emergency against Communist insurgents, known as Communist Terrorists or CTs. The CTs had launched an uprising in 1948 in support of their perception that Malayan independence did not directly lead to the installation of a Communist government. The 10th Gurkhas were involved in the Emergency from the beginning, the conflict was similar to the Burma campaign. The regiment remained involved until the official conclusion of the Emergency in 1960. The regiment lost 75 men during the conflict.

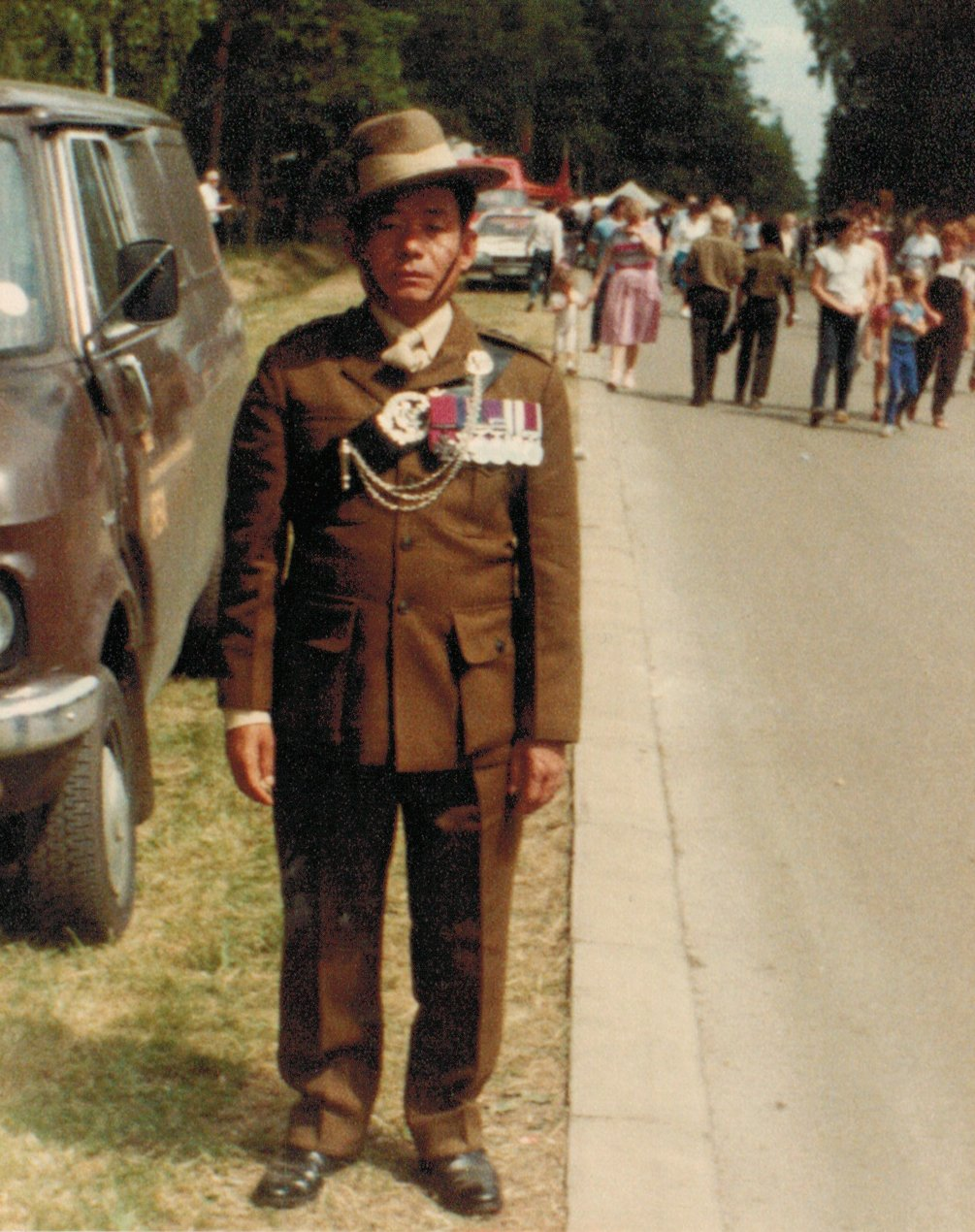
Captain Rambahadur Limbu VC MVO in 1984.

Another conflict in the Far East began in 1962, the Indonesian Confrontation, after an Indonesian-backed rebellion took place in Brunei and Borneo was swiftly quelled. The following year hostilities broke out between British-backed Malaysia and Indonesia. The two battalions of the regiment undertook two tours each, taking place in 1964 and 1965 respectively. In 1965 the regiment gained its first, and only, Victoria Cross (VC). Lance-Corporal Rambahadur Limbu of the 2nd Battalion received the VC for his actions in an incident in the Bau district in Sarawak, Borneo during Operation Claret which was carried out against Indonesian-held Kalimantan. This action has subsequently become known as the Battle of Bau. The conflict concluded in 1966, by which time the 10th Gurkhas had suffered 11 men killed.

In 1968 the regiment was reduced to a single battalion when the 1st Battalion absorbed the 2nd Battalion. It remained in the Far East, based in Hong Kong, until 1973 when it was sent to England for the first time. Initially it was based at Church Crookham in Hampshire, however, the following year the regiment was dispatched to Cyprus to protect the British Sovereign Base Area at Dhekelia in the aftermath of the Turkish invasion of Cyprus. During their deployment the 10th Gurkhas attempted to keep the peace, at times literally having to place themselves in the line-of-fire between the opposing factions. The 1st Battalion was deployed to Brunei for the first time in 1977. Since the rebellion in 1962 in which a Marxist, Indonesian-backed uprising had occurred, a Gurkha battalion has been present in Brunei at the request of HM the Sultan.

Throughout the 1970s and 1980s the regiment was deployed to Hong Kong, Brunei and Church Crookham. The regiment performed internal security (IS) duties in Hong Kong, including patrolling the border with China in an attempt at preventing the illegal immigration of people to the colony.

In 1990 the regiment was authorised after almost 100 years of requests, to maintain the lineage of the 10th Madras Infantry, thus gaining the battle honours and traditions going back to the 14th Battalion of Coast Sepoys who had been raised by the East India Company in 1766. The lineage is special in that it is among the oldest in the British Indian Army. Although the lineage was granted, the history of the regiment is not continuous. The modern regiment was re-formed exclusively from the Kubo Valley Military Police after the old 10th Madras had been disbanded.

The regiment deployed to Hong Kong for the last time in 1991, remaining there until amalgamation in 1994.

The 10th Gurkhas were amalgamated with the 2nd, 6th and 7th Gurkha Rifles to form the Royal Gurkha Rifles in 1994; the 10th Gurkhas becoming the 3rd Battalion. In 1996 the Battalion was amalgamated with the 2nd Battalion of the Royal Gurkha Rifles while in Brunei.

== Lineage ==
1766–1767: 14th Battalion of Coast Sepoys
1767–1769: Amboor Battalion
1769–1770: 11th Carnatic Battalion
1770–1784: 10th Carnatic Battalion
1784–1796: 10th Madras Battalion
1796–1824: 1st Battalion, 10th Regiment Madras Native Infantry
1824–1885: 10th Regiment Madras Native Infantry
1885–1890: 10th Regiment, Madras Infantry
1890–1891: 10th (Burma) Regiment of Madras Infantry
1891–1892: 10th Regiment (1st Burma Battalion) of Madras Infantry
1892–1895: 10th Regiment (1st Burma Rifles), Madras Infantry
1895–1901: 10th Regiment (1st Burma Gurkha Rifles), Madras Infantry
1901–1950: 10th Gurkha Rifles
1950–1994: 10th Princess Mary's Own Gurkha Rifles.

== Uniform, badge and honorary badges ==
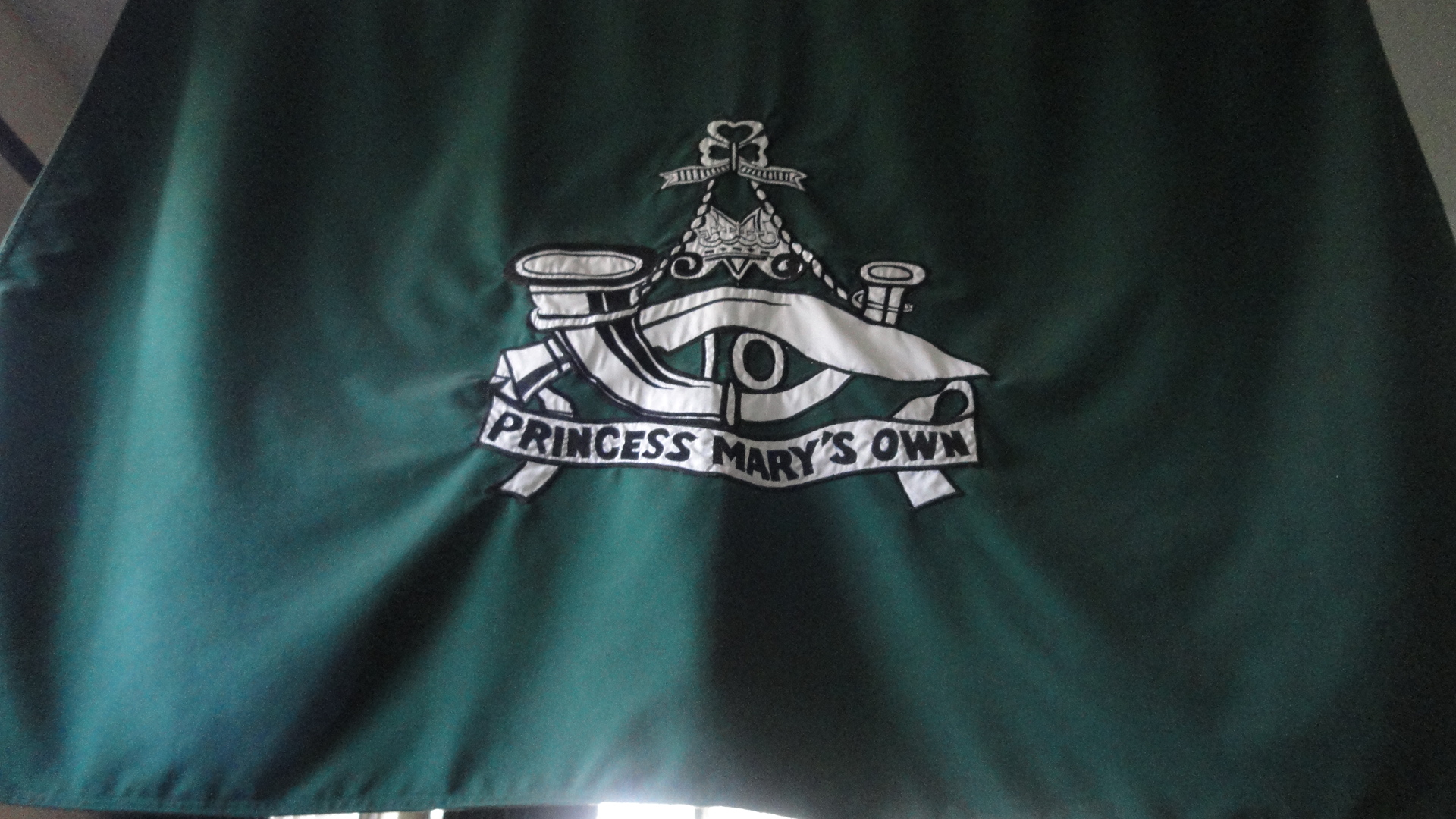
Princess Mary's Own

The full dress worn by the regiment from 1890 until 1914 was the standard Gurkha uniform of rifle green, with puttees and black facings. The headdress was a black Kilmarnock cap with the badge described below. Pipers for the 1st Battalion wore the Hunting Stewart tartan of the Royal Scots, who had trained them prior to 1895. British and Gurkha officers were distinguished by five rows of hussar style braiding and black chain gimp shoulder cords on their tunics.

A bugle horn stringed interlaced with a kukri fesswise the blade to the sinister, above the kukri the cipher of HRH Princess Mary (The Princess Royal) and below it the numeral 10.

- The Badge of a Rock Fort for Amboor.
- The Badge of an Elephant for Assaye.

The 10th Gurkha Rifles were reportedly distinguished from other Gurkha regiments by carrying silver handled kukris, specially manufactured in Nepal.

== Battle honours ==
- Amboor;
- Carnatic;
- Mysore 1792, Assaye 1803, Ava 1852, Burma 1885–87;
- First World War: Helles, Krithia, Suvla, Sari Bair, Gallipoli 1915, Suez Canal, Egypt 1915, Sharqat, Mesopotamia 1916–18;
- Afghanistan 1919;
- Second World War: Iraq 1941, Deir ez-Zor, Syria 1941, Coriano, Santarcangelo, Senio Floodbank, Bologna, Sillaro Crossing, Gaiana Crossing, Italy 1943–45, Monywa 1942, Imphal, Tuitum, Tamu Road, Shenam Pass, Litan, Bishenpur, Tengnoupal, Mandalay, Myinmu Bridgehead, Kyaukse 1945, Meiktila, Capture of Meiktila, Defence of Meiktila, Irrawaddy River, Rangoon Road, Pegu 1945, Sittang 1945, Burma 1942–45.

== Victoria Cross ==
- Lance-Corporal Rambahadur Limbu of the 2nd Battalion, Sarawak 1965.

== Regimental Colonels ==
Colonels of the regiment were:

10th Gurkha Rifles

- 1947–1957: Gen. Sir Alexander Frank Philip Christison, Bt. GBE, CB, DSO, MC, DL

10th Princess Mary's Own Gurkha Rifles (1949)

- 1957–1959: Brig. Michael Rookherst Roberts, DSO
- 1959–1966: Maj-Gen. Richard Neville Anderson, CB, CBE, DSO
- 1966–1975: Gen. Sir Peter Mervyn Hunt, GCB, DSO, OBE, ADCGen
- 1975–1977: Maj-Gen. Edward John Sidney Burnett, CB, DSO, OBE, MC
- 1977–1985: Maj-Gen. Ronald William Lorne McAlister, CB
- 1985–1994: Lt-Gen. Sir Garry Dene Johnson, KCB, OBE, MC
- 1994: amalgamated with the 2nd King Edward VII’s Own Gurkha Rifles, 6th Queen Elizabeth's Own Gurkha Rifles and 7th Duke of Edinburgh's Own Gurkha Rifles to form The Royal Gurkha Rifles

== See also ==
- Gurkhas
- British Army
- Gurkha Welfare Trust
- List of Brigade of Gurkhas recipients of the Victoria Cross

== Bibliography ==
- Carman, W.Y. (1969). Indian Army Uniforms Under the British – Artillery, Engineers and Infantry. London: Morgan-Grampian.
- Cross, J.P; Gurung, Buddhiman (2002). Gurkhas at War: Eyewitness Accounts from World War II to Iraq. London: Greenhill Books. ISBN 978-1-85367-727-4.
- Parker, John (2000). The Gurkhas: The Inside Story of the World's Most Feared Soldiers. London: Headline Book Publishing. ISBN 978-0-7472-6243-5.
- Parker, John (2005). The Gurkhas: The Inside Story of the World's Most Feared Soldiers. London: Headline Book Publishing. ISBN 978-0-7553-1415-7.
