= The Importance of Being Icelandic =

- Directed by: Jon Gustafsson
- Written by: Jon Gustafsson; Olga McVarrish; Caelum Vatnsdal
- Produced by: Marc Stephenson
- Narrated by: Jon Gustafsson
- Production company: Marble Island Pictures
- Release date: 1998
- Running time: 42 minutes
- Country: Canada
- Language: English

The Importance of Being Icelandic is a 1998 documentary film by the filmmaker Jon Gustafsson (born in Iceland and living in Canada) that traces the steps of three Icelandic Canadians on a different quest of discovering their Icelandic heritage by going to Iceland. In addition to their time in Iceland, he returns with them to Canada and captures their reactions of the Islendingadagurinn celebrated each year at Gimli. The contrasts in perspective between his viewpoint on Canadian culture and that of three Icelandic-Canadians on a quest for their ancestral heritage is at the centre of the documentary.
