= Simon Merrells =

British actor

Simon Scott Merrells
- Born: Epping, Essex, England
- Occupation: Actor
- Relatives: Jason Merrells (brother)

Simon Merrells is an English film, television and stage actor best known for his portrayal of Marcus Licinius Crassus in Spartacus: War of the Damned.

== Early life ==
Merrells was born in London, three years before his brother Jason Merrells. He started drama school, but soon left to work as a minicab driver to fund travelling to Mexico, where he painted. He became involved in fringe theatre in Brighton, where his brother was living, when he returned to England.

== Career ==
=== Stage ===
Merrells appeared with his brother Jason in a production of The Comedy of Errors in 2007, playing twins.

Merrells has worked with director Steven Berkoff several times, first in a world tour of the play Coriolanus. In 2009, he played Terry Malloy in On the Waterfront, directed by Berkoff. Variety said that "Compact and bristling with contained energy, Simon Merrells has the right physicality to play Terry but never quite emerges from Brando’s long shadow"; The Independent said he "brings his own brand of studied vulnerability and sullen pride to the part".

Merrells performed as Benedick in Much Ado About Nothing at the Liverpool Playhouse in 2007, and starred as Oedipus in another Berkoff production at the same venue in 2011. He was nominated for a Stage Award for Best Actor for that role. Later that year he played detective Philip Marlowe in The Big Sleep; The Stage said he was "charismatic" but "a touch too suave and slick".

He has appeared on television in London's Burning as DSO Griggs, Family Affairs (as bouncer Conrad Williams), and Merseybeat.

=== Film and television ===
In 2009, Merrells had a lead role in the 2009 film, Invisible Eyes. In 2010, he portrayed Ben Talbot, brother of Lawrence Talbot in remake of The Wolfman. In 2013, he portrayed the Roman commander Marcus Licinius Crassus in the Starz series Spartacus: War of the Damned. He had to undergo a strict diet and four-week fitness boot camp in preparation for the role, losing 21 lbs. Also that year, he portrayed character Mark Vega in the British horror film Judas Ghost. He also plays The Founder in the 2013 American remake of The Tomorrow People.

In 2014, Merrells starred in a small sci-fi film named Index Zero as Kurt, a main character, and two films in 2015, Billionaire Ransom (originally titled Take Down) and Victrix. In 2015, Merrells guest-starred in the Syfy channel series Dominion as a dyad named Julian. Also in 2015 Merrells starred in a futuristic short film called The Leap as an enforcement agent whose job it is to stop people trafficking on an interplanetary scale. In 2016, Merrells was cast as Tancrede de Hautville in the History channel's series Knightfall, which premiered in the United States in December 2017.

== Filmography ==
Year	Title	Role
2009	Invisible Eyes	Dan
2010	The Wolfman	Ben Talbot
2013	Spartacus: War of the Damned	Marcus Licinius Crassus
2013	Judas Ghost	Mark Vega
2014	Index Zero	Kurt
2014	The Tomorrow People	Hugh Bathory / The Founder
2015	Billionaire Ransom	Jonathan Tilton-Scofield
2015	Dominion	Julian
2016	Victrix	Marius
2017–18	Legends of Tomorrow	Julius Caesar
2017–19	Knightfall	Tancrede de Hautville
2018	12 Monkeys	Andrus
2019	Good Omens	Leslie the International Express Man
2022	The Lord of the Rings: The Rings of Power	Watchwarden Revion
2023	A Million Days	Anderson
2023	The Winter King	Gundleus
2024	Miss Fallaci	Irving Hoffman
2025	Afterburn	Tank Commander
2025	Outlander: Blood of My Blood	Malcom MacKinnon Grant
