= Andrew Mynarski =

Canadian Victoria Cross recipient (1916–1944)

Andrew Mynarski VC
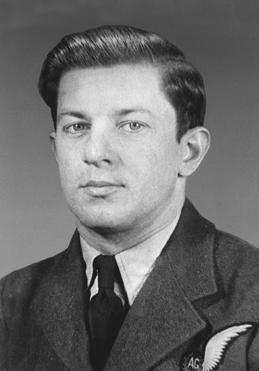
- Mynarski c. 1943
- Born: 14 October 1916; Winnipeg, Manitoba, Canada
- Died: 13 June 1944 (aged 27); Cambrai, France
- Burial place: Méharicourt Communal Cemetery
- Military career
- Allegiance: Canada
- Branch: Canadian Army (1940–41); Royal Canadian Air Force (1941–44)
- Service years: 1940–1944
- Rank: Pilot Officer
- Nickname: Andy
- Unit: No. 419 Squadron
- Conflicts: Second World War: European air campaign (DOW)
- Awards: Victoria Cross

Andrew Charles Mynarski (14 October 1916 – 13 June 1944) was a Canadian airman and a recipient of the Victoria Cross, the highest award for bravery in the face of the enemy that can be awarded to British and Commonwealth forces. Mynarski was 27 years old and flew with No. 419 "Moose" Squadron, Royal Canadian Air Force, during the Second World War when he died while attempting to rescue a trapped fellow crewman. His Victoria Cross, which was awarded in 1946, was the last Victoria Cross received by any Canadian serviceman in the Second World War.

== Early years ==
Mynarski was born in Winnipeg, Manitoba, on 14 October 1916, the son of Polish immigrants. Known as Andy to his close friends, he had five other siblings, two brothers and three sisters. Mynarski was educated at King Edward and Isaac Newton Elementary Schools, later graduating from St. John's Technical School. To help support his family after his father's death, at the age of 16, he worked as a chamois cutter.

== Wartime service ==
In 1940, Mynarski joined the Royal Winnipeg Rifles, a militia unit, but only served a short time before enlisting in the Royal Canadian Air Force (RCAF). In September 1941, he was posted to No. 3 Manning Depot in Edmonton. After basic training, he went to No. 2 Wireless School in Calgary but had trouble learning Morse Code. He was then posted to No. 3 Bomb and Gunnery School at RCAF Station Macdonald , Macdonald, Manitoba, graduating just before Christmas as an air-gunner, earning his "AG" brevet.

Mynarski was promoted to temporary sergeant in Halifax just prior to going overseas in January 1942. After a series of transfers through operational training units, as a warrant officer (second class), he joined Flying Officer Art de Breyne's crew as the mid-upper gunner in No. 419 "Moose" Squadron, based at RAF Middleton St. George, Darlington, County Durham.

The squadron first flew combat operations using Vickers Wellington bombers before converting to the Handley Page Halifax bombers. After a short introduction to this four-engine heavy bomber, 419 Squadron began to receive the Avro Lancaster bomber in 1944, including examples built in Canada by the Victory Aircraft Company in Malton, Ontario. In early June, de Bryne's crew received Canadian-built Avro Lancaster Mk X bomber, #KB726, coded "VR-A" (call sign A for Able).

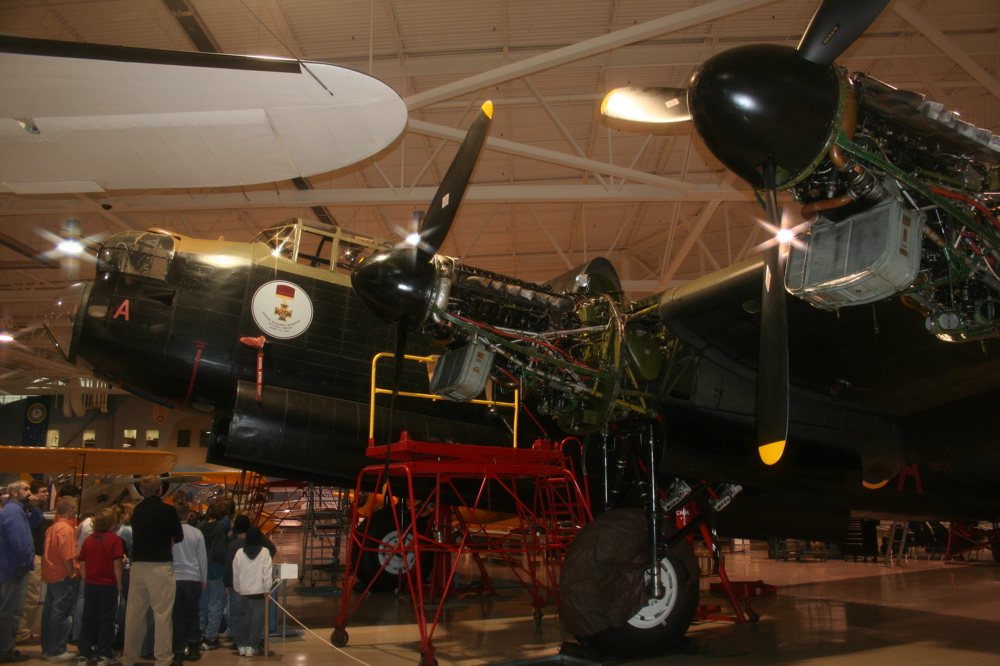
Mynarski Memorial Lancaster

=== Mynarski's last "op" ===
In the aftermath of D-Day attacks on 12 June 1944, Mynarski was aboard KB726, taking part in the crew's 12th operation, a raid on Cambrai in northern France. They reached their target at midnight, Tuesday 13 June. After encountering flak over the coastline and briefly being "coned" by searchlights, the Lancaster was attacked by a Junkers Ju 88 enemy night fighter. Raked by cannon fire with major strikes on the port engines and centre fuselage, a hydraulic fire engulfed the bomber. Losing both port engines, de Breyne ordered the crew to bail out. As Mynarski approached the rear escape door he saw through the inferno in the rear that tail gunner Pilot Officer Pat Brophy was trapped in his turret. The tail turret had been jammed part way through its rotation to the escape position.

Without hesitation, Mynarski made his way through the flames to Brophy's assistance. All his efforts were in vain, initially using a fire axe to try to pry open the doors before finally resorting to beating at the turret with his hands. With Mynarski's flight suit and parachute on fire, Brophy eventually waved him away. Mynarski crawled back through the hydraulic fire, returned to the rear door where he paused and saluted. He then reputedly said "Good night, sir," his familiar nightly sign-off to his friend, and jumped.

Except for Brophy, all crew members of the Lancaster managed to escape the burning bomber. Five left through the front escape hatch on the floor of the cockpit. When bomb aimer Jack Friday, tried to release the escape hatch cover in the aircraft's nose, the rushing wind ripped it from his hands. The hatch cover caught him above his left eye and knocked him out. He fell into the open hatch and jammed it closed until Flight engineer Roy Vigars reached him to quickly clip on Friday's parachute and toss him out the hatch while pulling the unconscious crewman's rip cord. Only Mynarski managed to leave via the rear escape door.

Mynarski's descent was rapid due to the burnt parachute and shroud lines, resulting in a heavy impact on landing. He landed alive though severely burned, with his clothes still on fire. French farmers who spotted the flaming bomber found him and took him to a German field hospital but he died shortly afterwards of severe burns. He was buried in a local cemetery. Brophy remained trapped in the bomber when it crashed in a farm field. As the bomber disintegrated, and began breaking apart, Brophy survived the crash and the subsequent detonation of the bomb load. Still lodged in his turret, the crash broke the turret open with him pitched out, striking a tree and being temporarily knocked out.

Four of the crew members: Brophy, navigator Robert Bodie, radio operator James Kelly and pilot de Breyne were hidden by the French and, except for Brophy, returned to England shortly after the crash. Vigars remained with the unconscious Friday and both were captured by the Germans, being interned until liberated by American troops. Brophy joined French Resistance fighters and, after joining a resistance unit to continue the fight on the ground behind enemy lines, returned to London in September 1944, where he learned of Mynarski's death. It was not until 1945 when Brophy was reunited with the rest of the crew that the details of his final moments on the aircraft were revealed. He related the story of the valiant efforts made by Mynarski to save him.

Mynarski lies buried in Grave 20 of the Commonwealth War Graves Commission plot in the Méharicourt Communal Cemetery, near Amiens, France.

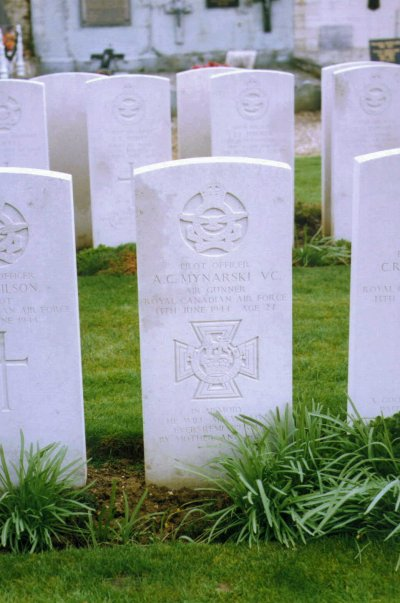
Mynarski's grave at Meharicourt Communal Cemetery near Amiens, France

== Legacy ==
=== Victoria Cross ===
In late 1945, de Breyne started the process of gaining recognition for Mynarski's extraordinary deed by recommending an award and enquiring about the location of his grave. Although facing some initial resistance, the recommendation worked its way up the command structure of the RCAF and RAF. On 11 October 1946, a Victoria Cross was posthumously awarded for "valour of the highest order" to Andrew Charles Mynarski, by then also awarded the rank of pilot officer.

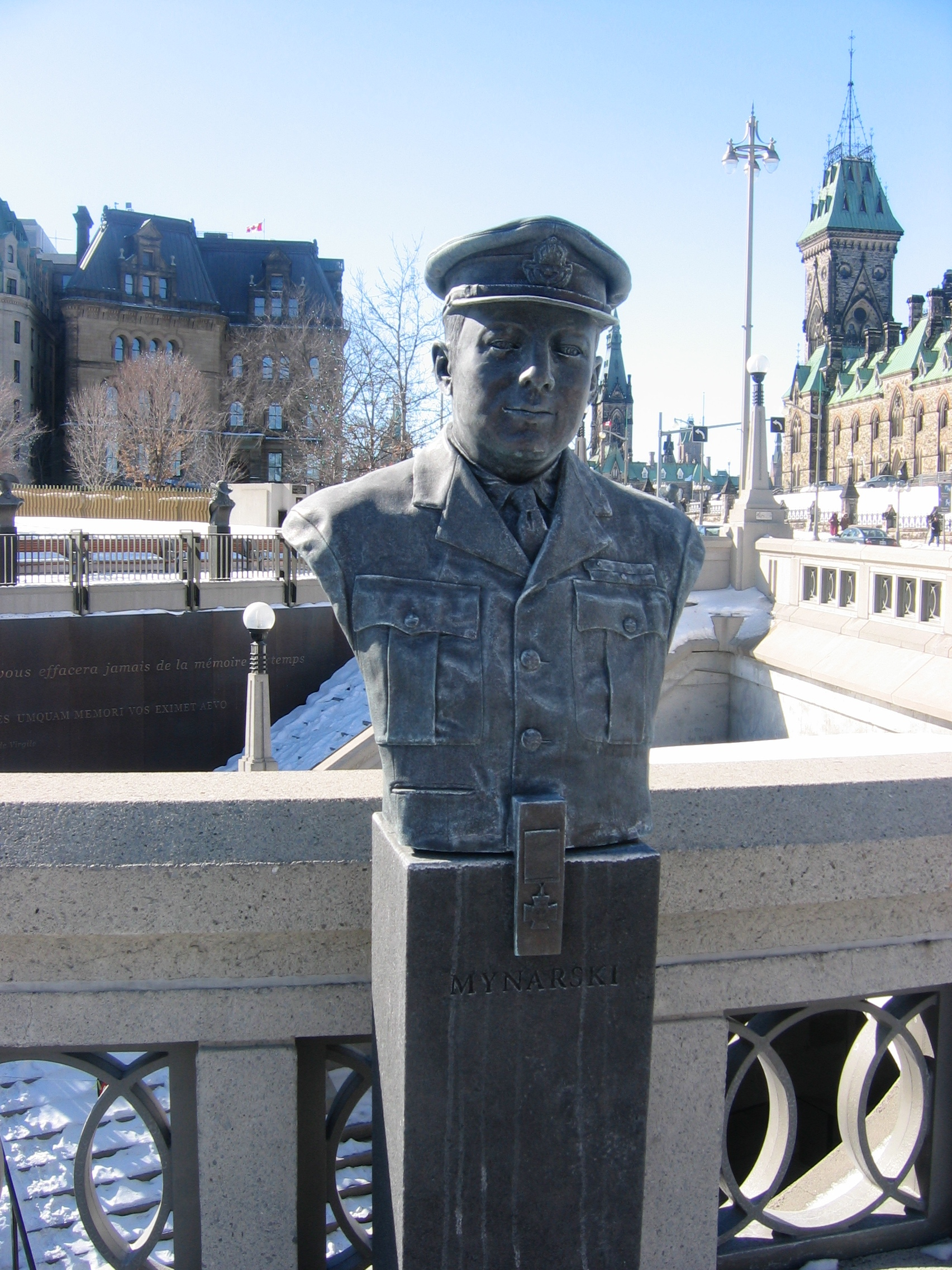
The "Valiants" bust of Andrew Mynarski unveiled at the Cenotaph War Memorial on 11 November 2006 in Ottawa, Ontario.

=== Remembering Andrew Mynarski ===
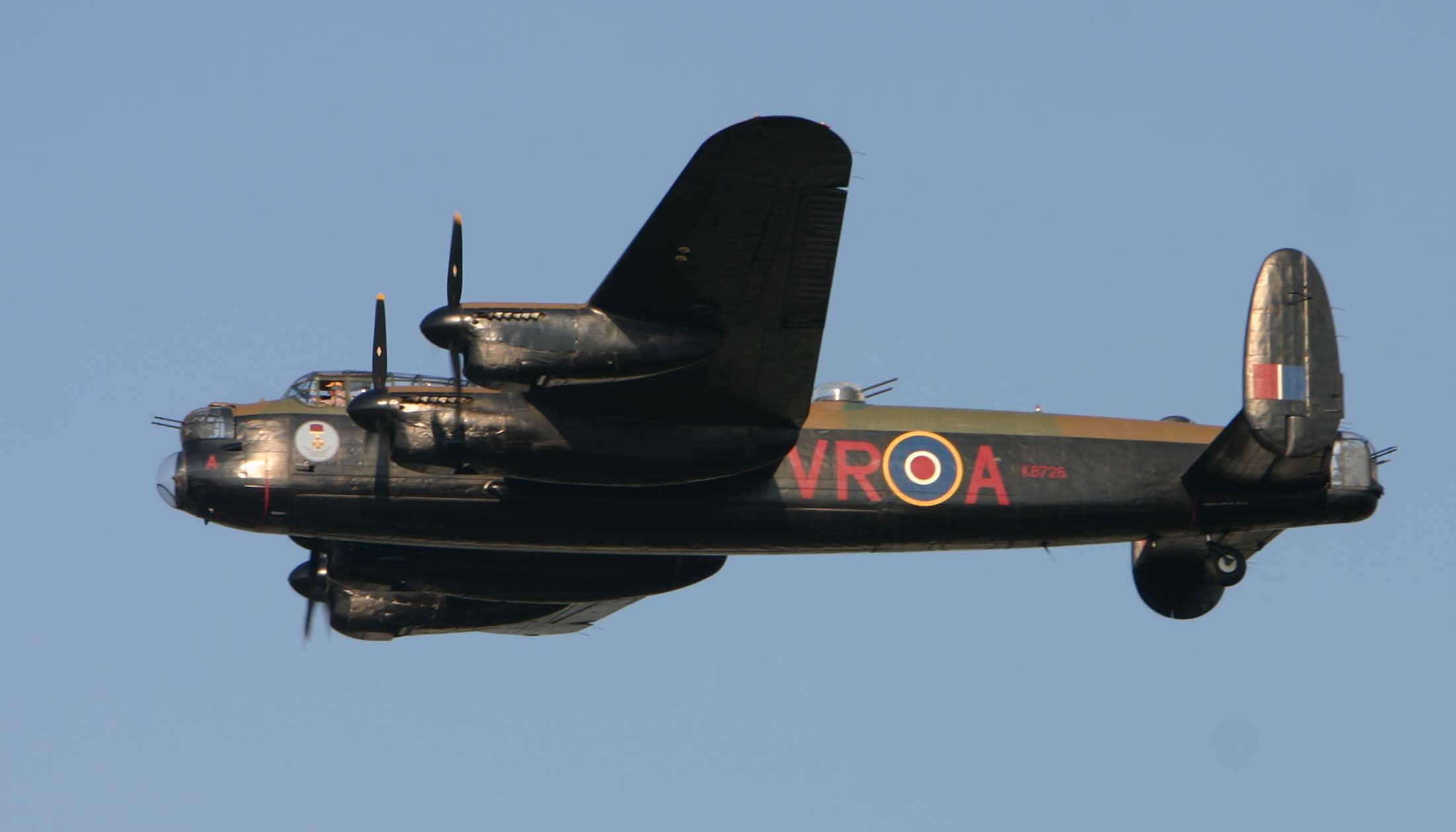
Mynarski Memorial Avro Lancaster

Mynarski's Victoria Cross was loaned by his family to Air Command in 1989 and is on display in the entrance foyer at the Mynarski Memorial Room of the Headquarters, 1 Canadian Air Division, in Winnipeg (where a number of other family artifacts are on display). No. 419 Squadron in CFB Cold Lake also displays the original fire axe that Mynarski used to try to free the jammed Lancaster turret; the axe was recovered from the Lancaster bomber at the crash site in northern France.

Andrew Mynarski VC School in Winnipeg, the Mynarski municipal ward of Winnipeg, a park in Alberta, the Royal Canadian Legion "Andrew Mynarski" Branch 34, and 573 "Andrew Mynarski" Air Cadet squadron all bear his name. A chain of three lakes in Manitoba has been named after him by the Geographical Placenames of Canada and at CFB Penhold, one of the locations in which he trained, the married quarters area is known as Mynarski Park. Mynarski was also honoured in 1973 when he was inducted into Canada's Aviation Hall of Fame.

Avro Lancaster FM213 of the Canadian Warplane Heritage Museum in Hamilton, Ontario, one of only two airworthy Lancasters in the world, is known as the Mynarski Memorial Lancaster in honour of Mynarski, and is painted in the markings of his aircraft.

Mynarski's bust has joined the other "Valiants" when the Valiants Memorial was unveiled in Ottawa, Ontario. This memorial site is a collection of nine busts and five statues and a large bronze wall inscription that commemorates 14 individuals celebrated for their personal contributions, but also representing critical moments in Canada's military history.

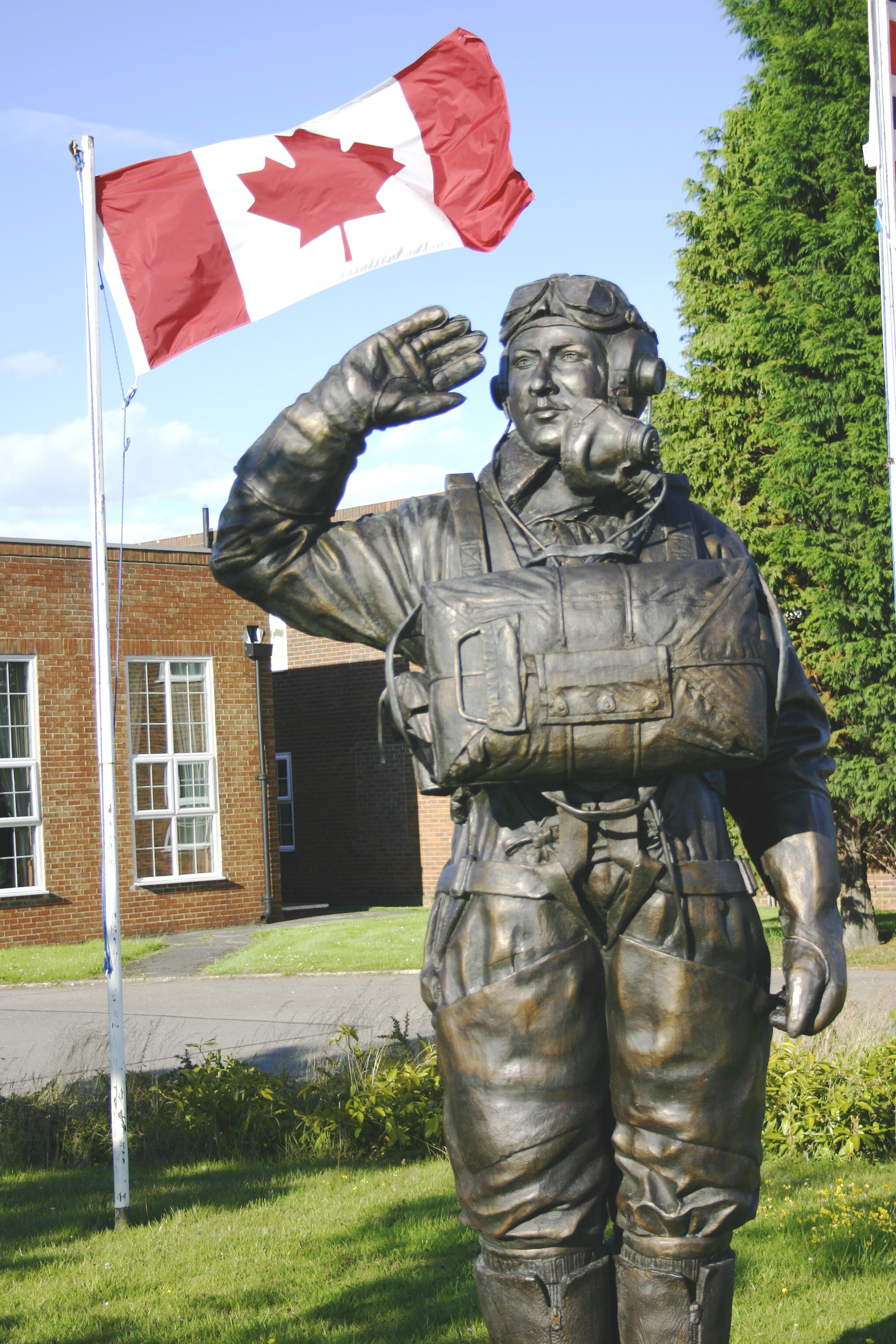
Andrew Mynarski Memorial Statue – RAF MStG

A larger-than-life bronze statue of Pilot Officer Mynarski, sculpted by Keith Maddison, was dedicated in 2005 outside the former Officers' Mess, now the St George Hotel, at RAF Middleton St. George, the bomber base in England where he served. The memorial depicts Mynarski at the rear of the stricken aircraft, his right arm raised in a salute. Andrew Mynarski is also remembered at the St George Hotel by the "Mynarski Bar", a bar dedicated to him where images of him and a replica VC are on display.

A local Polish organization from the community area near where Mynarski grew up has erected a memorial plaque in Winnipeg's Kildonan Park to honour Mynarski.

In January 2006, a group of local Winnipeggers prominent in business, government, heritage, military and community organizations embarked on a fund-raising project to cast and erect in Winnipeg, a new statue in a campaign known as "Bring Andrew home". The Mynarski Statue Project operated under the auspices of the Air Cadet League of Canada (Manitoba) Inc. including the parents' committee of 573 Andrew Mynarski VC Royal Canadian Air Cadets Squadron, with support from the Canadian Aviation Historical Society. The Mynarski Statue Project Committee coordinated fundraising and community support and received important media coverage through journalist Mr. Gordon Sinclair Jr. of the Winnipeg Free Press.

After learning that the original mould used to cast the statue at St. George was feasibly unavailable to use for a new statue in Winnipeg, the Committee decided to consider alternatives around 2008–2009. In December 2009, Mr. Charles Johnston, a Winnipeg sculptor/artist was selected to create a new statue.

Fundraising and communication efforts continued until 2010, when a Winnipeg business owner and philanthropist, Brian Frank Klaponski became involved. After learning that his uncle had grown up with Andrew Mynarski and had been Mynarski's best friend at Isaac Newton School in Winnipeg's North End in the 1930s, Klaponski offered a significant donation for the project. That donation catalyzed the final statue design and approval process.

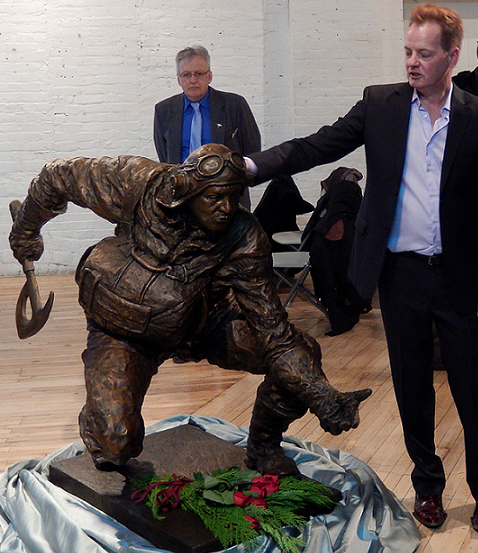
Artist Charlie Johnston with the Andrew Mynarski VC Winnipeg Statue 2014 with Bill Zuk, statue committee chair, in background

The artist presented several concepts to the Committee as sketches and maquettes, with the final statue design chosen in 2013. Johnston created a full-size clay model and arranged to have it cast in bronze in early 2014. He brought it home to Winnipeg from the U.S. foundry that summer. It was unveiled to the public during a reception held 14 November 2014 at Winnipeg's Frame Arts Warehouse.

Winnipeg's Andrew Mynarski VC Memorial Statue will be dedicated in Winnipeg's Vimy Ridge Memorial Park during a public ceremony at 1:00 p.m. on 12 June 2015.

=== In the media ===
Mynarski's story has been dramatized in the Canadian Historica Foundation's series of Heritage Minutes. Mynarski was also profiled in the 2006 docudrama Victoria Cross Heroes which included archive footage and dramatisations of his Victoria Cross-winning action. His story was recently recounted in As Close as Brothers (2011) documentary, shot in Canada using the Mynarski Memorial Lancaster as well as an Avro Lancaster bomber and artifacts at the Bomber Command Museum in Nanton, Alberta.

The eight-minute film Mynarski Death Plummet (2014), directed by Matthew Rankin, looks expressionistically at the final moments in Mynarski's life. The film played at the 2014 Toronto International Film Festival and was selected for the 2015 Sundance Film Festival. (Note: The film was included in the list of "Canada's Top Ten" short films of 2014, selected by a panel of filmmakers and industry professionals organized by TIFF.)
