= Jason Arnopp =

British writer

- Occupation: Writer
- Writing career
- Language: English
- Genres: Horror; science fiction
- Website: jasonarnopp.com

Jason Arnopp is a British novelist and scriptwriter, with a background in journalism.

He wrote the 2011 horror feature Stormhouse and has scripted Doctor Who audiobooks and plays for the BBC and Big Finish ranges. In 2012, two of his horror stories, "Beast in the Basement" and "A Sincere Warning About the Entity in Your Home" were published for Kindle. He has contributed to BBC Radio 4's Recorded for Training Purposes and Laurence & Gus comedy shows. His background is in journalism and he has regularly written for the likes of Heat and Doctor Who Magazine. In December 2013, he was a talking-head on Channel Five's The Greatest Ever Christmas Movies (Objective Productions).

In 2016, his novel The Last Days of Jack Sparks was published by Orbit Books. It has since been optioned as a movie by Imagine Entertainment.

Arnopp is represented by Oli Munson at AM Heath Literary Agents and managed by Lawrence Mattis at Circle of Confusion

He used to be an editor for Kerrang! magazine; he appears as himself in Lords of Chaos, contacting Euronymous to inquire about the Black Circle.

His latest novel is Ghoster, published in 2019.

== Writing credits ==
Production	Company/Broadcaster	Notes/Dates
Friday the 13th: Hate-Kill-Repeat	Black Flame	Novel, 2005
Look at Me	Magician Pictures	Scriptwriter, short film 2008
Big Mistake	Magician Pictures	Script editor, short film 2009
Laurence & Gus: Hearts & Minds	BBC Radio 4	Sketch writer, 2009 series
Recorded for Training Purposes	BBC Radio 4	Sketch writer, 2009 & 2010 series
Doctor Who: The Demons of Red Lodge and Other Stories	Big Finish	Scriptwriter, audio drama, 2010
The Sarah Jane Adventures: Deadly Download	BBC Audiobooks	Writer, audiobook, 2010
Ghost Writer	TAPS	Scriptwriter, 24-minute film, 2010
Tempting Fates	Eye Film & Television	Scriptwriter, web series 2010
Doctor Who: Army of Death	Big Finish	Scriptwriter, audio drama, 2011
Stormhouse	Scanner-Rhodes Productions	Scriptwriter and executive producer, horror feature film, 2011
Doctor Who: The Gemini Contagion	BBC Audiobooks	Writer, audiobook, 2011
A Sincere Warning About the Entity in Your Home	Retribution Books	Horror short story, 2012
Beast in the Basement	Retribution Books	Horror-thriller novella, 2012
The Man Inside	Scanner-Rhodes Production	Script editor, urban drama feature film, 2012
Doctor Who: UNIT Dominion	Big Finish	Co-scriptwriter, audio drama, 2012
Behind the Sofa: Celebrity Memories of Doctor Who	Gollancz	Contributor, 2013
The Last Days of Jack Sparks	Orbit Books	Novel, 2016
Ghoster	Orbit Books	Novel, 2019
