= Gadgetman =

- Genre: Sci-fi/comedy
- Based on: Operation Gadgetman! by Malorie Blackman
- Screenplay by: Patrick Harkins; Ben Rostul
- Directed by: Jim Goddard
- Starring: Marina Sirtis; Allan Corduner; Martin Delaney; James Weir; Frances Carrigan; Patrick Delaney; Ian McColl; Tam Dean Burn; Ayesha Antoine; Peter Woodward; James Young
- Theme music composer: Richard Hartley
- Country of origin: United Kingdom; United States
- Original language: English

Production
- Executive producers: Robert Love; J. Nigel Pickard
- Production location: Scotland
- Cinematography: Jim Peters
- Editor: Jon Gew
- Running time: 135 minutes
- Production companies: Flextech Television Limited; Hallmark Channel; Hallmark Entertainment; Scottish Television Enterprises

Original release
- Release: 1996

Gadgetman is a 1996 American-British TV movie directed by Jim Goddard starring Martin Delaney and Marina Sirtis.

== Plot ==
When inventor Professor McNeil is captured by kidnappers attempting to access ATMs, his son Bean and Bean's friends use computers to rescue him.

== Cast ==
- Marina Sirtis as Detective Inspector Walker
- Allan Corduner as Professor McNeil
- Martin Delaney as Bean McNeil
  - Patrick Delaney as Young Bean McNeil
- James Weir as Sumo
- Frances Carrigan as Mrs. McNeil
- Iain McColl as Lonnie Dolan
- Tam Dean Burn as Donnie Dolan
- Ayesha Antoine as Frankie Scouler
- Peter Woodward as Sergeant Munro
- James Young as Jimmy "Chip" Curry
