= Katie Flynn =

British author (1936–2019)

- Born: 1936 or 1937; Norwich, England
- Died: January 2019 (aged 82)
- Occupation: Author
- Children: 4
- Writing career
- Pen name: Katie Flynn

Judy Turner was an author who wrote under the pen name Katie Flynn and Judith Saxton. According to her publisher, her books sold more than eight million copies. She died in January 2019, aged 82.

== Biography ==
Flynn was born in Norwich, and lived in Wrexham after her marriage. She started her career by writing short stories and articles. She had over 90 novels published under various pseudonyms. She continued to write after being diagnosed with myalgic encephalomyelitis, with her daughter Holly working as her assistant. She died on 1 January 2019, aged 82. She had 4 children. Judith's daughter, Holly, now writes under the pen-name Katie Flynn.

== Selected works ==
- Darkest Before Dawn (1988)
- Tales for Christmas: Free festive tasters to warm your heart (2013)
- Christmas at Tuppenny Corner (2018)
- A Mother's Love (2019)
- A Liverpool Lass (1992)
- The Girl from Penny Lane (1993)
- Liverpool Taffy (1994)
- Mersey Girls (1994)
- Strawberry Fields (1995)
- From Clare to Here (1997)
- Rainbow's End (1997)
- Rose of Tralee (1998)
- No Silver Spoon (1999)
- Polly's Angel (2000)
- The Girl from Seaforth Sands (2001)
- The Liverpool Rose (2001)
- Poor Little Rich Girl (2002)
- The Bad Penny (2002)
- Down Daisy Street (2003)
- A Kiss and a Promise (2003)
- Two Penn'orth of Sky (2004)
- A Long and Lonely Road (2004)
- The Cuckoo Child (2005)
- Darkest Before Dawn (2005)
- Orphans of the Storm (2006)
- Little Girl Lost (2006)
- Beyond the Blue Hills (2006)
- Forgotten Dreams (2007)
- Sunshine and Shadows (2008)
- Such Sweet Sorrow (2008)
- A Mother's Hope (2009)
- In Time for Christmas (2009)
- Heading Home (2009)
- A Mistletoe Kiss (2010)
- The Lost Days of Summer (2011)
- Christmas Wishes (2011)
- The Runaway (2012)
- A Sixpenny Christmas (2012)
- The Forget-Me-Not Summer (2013)
- A Christmas to Remember (2013)
- The Arcade (2014)
- Time to Say Goodbye (2014)
- A Family Christmas (2014)
- A Summer Promise (2015)
- When Christmas Bells Ring (2015)
- An Orphan's Christmas (2016)
- The Christmas Candle (2017)
- Christmas at Tuppenny Corner (2018)
- A Mother's Love (2019)
- A Christmas Gift (2019)
- White Christmas (2021)
- Winter's Orphan (2023)
