= Jon Gustafsson =

Film director and photographer

- Born: Akranes, Iceland
- Occupations: Film director, screenwriter and photographer.
- Website: http://www.jongustafsson.com

Jon Gustafsson, sometimes credited as Jon Einarsson Gustafsson, is an Iceland born film director and photographer. The Icelandic spelling of his name is Jón Gústafsson. Best known for directing the Canadian documentary film Wrath of Gods, starring Gerard Butler, Wendy Ord, Sarah Polley, Paul Stephens and Sturla Gunnarsson. He grew up in Iceland where he started his career as a television performer before studying filmmaking at Manchester Polytechnic and directing for film and theatre at CalArts where he was mentored by the legendary Ealing Studios director Alexander Mackendrick. Wrath of Gods was his second documentary for CBC Newsworld, the first one was The Importance of Being Icelandic. He immigrated to Canada where he directed the low-budget feature film Kanadiana and the music video Brighter Hell for the Canadian rock band The Watchmen. In 2011 Jon Gustafsson produced the award winning short film In A Heartbeat, directed by Karolina Lewicka, through his production company Artio Films. He co-wrote and co-directed the feature film Shadowtown with Karolina Lewicka.

== Awards ==
Blizzard Award - Best Music Video - Brighter Hell, The Watchmen
Audience Award - Best Documentary Feature - Oxford International Film Festival 2007
Jury Award - Achievement in Filmmaking - Stony Brook Film Festival, NY, 2007
Jury Award - Best Documentary Feature shot in digital, Napa Sonoma WineCountry Film Festival 2007
Bronze Remi - Entertainment - WorldFest Huston International Film Festival 2007
Jury Award – Best Documentary – MOFF Santarém
Grand Jury Award – Best Documentary Feature – Red Rock Film Festival
Best Short Film - In A Heartbeat - International Children's Film Festival Bangalore 2011
Best Short Film - In A Heartbeat - Montevideo, Uruguay 2011
Honorable Mention - Columbus International Film + Video Festival, Ohio 2011
