= Wrath of Gods =

- Written by: Jon Gustafsson; Karolina Lewicka
- Produced by: Jon Gustafsson; Karolina Lewicka
- Starring: Gerard Butler; Stellan Skarsgård; Sarah Polley; Ingvar E. Sigurdsson; Sturla Gunnarsson
- Cinematography: Jon Gustafsson
- Music by: Hilmar Örn Hilmarsson
- Distributed by: Artio Distribution
- Release date: September 12, 2006
- Running time: 72 minutes
- Countries: Canada; Iceland
- Language: English

Wrath of Gods is a 2006 documentary film directed by Jon Gustafsson. It tells the story of the dramatic circumstances Canadian director Sturla Gunnarsson and his crew had to go through during the making of the 2005 film Beowulf & Grendel in Iceland.

The main focus of the documentary is on director Gunnarsson, but other participants are first assistant director Wendy Ord, stunt coordinator Peter Pedrero, film producers Paul Stephens and Eric Jordan, actors Gerard Butler, Stellan Skarsgård and Sarah Polley.

The director of Wrath of Gods, Jon Gustafsson, is credited in Beowulf & Grendel as one of Beowulf's warriors (Geat Warrior #2). Gerard Butler and Martin Delaney (who plays Thorfinn in the film) co-produced the documentary. The music was composed by Hilmar Örn Hilmarsson, who did the soundtrack for the film.

== Cast ==
- Gerard Butler
- Sturla Gunnarsson
- Wendy Ord
- Paul Stephens
- Eric Jordan
- Martin Delaney
- Michael Cowan
- Stellan Skarsgård
- Sarah Polley
- Ingvar Sigurdsson
- Tony Curran
- Jon Gustafsson

== Awards ==
- Audience Award - Best Documentary Feature - Oxford International Film Festival 2007
- Jury Award - Achievement in Filmmaking - Stony Brook Film Festival 2007
- Best Documentary Feature shot in digital - Napa Sonoma WineCountry Film Festival 2007
- Bronze Remi Award - film & video production - Entertainment WorldFest 2007
- Premio Especial do Juri - MOFF - Santarém, Portugal 2007
- Grand Jury Prize - Red Rock Film Festival, Utah 2007

== Festivals ==
- Oxford International Film Festival
- RiverRun International Film Festival
- Reykjavik International Film Festival
- Waterfront Film Festival
- Stony Brook Film Festival
- Napa Sonoma WineCountry Film Festival
- Revelation Perth International Film Festival
- NSI Film Exchange Canadian Film Festival
- MOFF - Santarém, Portugal
- Docudays, Beirut, Lebanon
- Fort Lauderdale International Film Festival
- Red Rock Film Festival
