= 1981 in the United Kingdom =

Events from the year 1981 in the United Kingdom.

== Incumbents ==
- Monarch – Elizabeth II
- Prime Minister – Margaret Thatcher (Conservative)

== Events ==
=== January ===
- 3 January – Princess Alice, Countess of Athlone, daughter of Prince Leopold, Duke of Albany, and last surviving grandchild of Queen Victoria, dies at Kensington Palace aged 97.
- 4 January – British Leyland workers vote to accept a peace formula in the Longbridge plant strike.
- 5 January
  - Peter Sutcliffe, a 34-year-old lorry driver from Bradford arrested on 2 January in Sheffield, is charged with being the notorious serial killer known as the "Yorkshire Ripper", who is believed to have murdered thirteen women and attacked seven others across northern England since 1975.
  - BBC Two's The Hitchhiker's Guide to the Galaxy television adaptation begins airing; it subsequently receives a Royal Television Society award as "Most Original Programme" of the year.
  - Cabinet reshuffle: Norman St John-Stevas and Angus Maude leave the Cabinet while Leon Brittan and Norman Fowler join the Cabinet.
- 7 January – A parcel bomb addressed to the Prime Minister is intercepted at the sorting office.
- 8 January
  - A terrorist bomb attack takes place on the RAF base at Uxbridge.
  - The report of the Royal Commission on criminal procedure is published.
- 9 January – The funeral of Princess Alice, Countess of Athlone, takes place at St George's Chapel, Windsor Castle, before her burial at Frogmore.
- 13 January – The prison officers' overtime ban ends.
- 14 January – The British Nationality Bill is published.
- 15 January – Two soldiers are found guilty of murder in Northern Ireland.
- 16 January
  - Northern Ireland civil rights campaigner and former Westminster MP Bernadette McAliskey is shot at her home in County Tyrone.
  - Inflation has fallen to 16.1%.
  - 78% of British Steel Corporation workers vote in favour of the chairman's "survival" plan.
- 18 January – Ten people are killed in the New Cross house fire. On 25 January, another victim dies in hospital.
- 21 January
  - Sir Norman Stronge, 86, and his son James, 48, both former Stormont MPs, are killed by the Provisional Irish Republican Army (IRA).
  - Two divers trapped below the North Sea are brought to safety to the surface.
- 22 January – Australian newspaper owner Rupert Murdoch agrees to buy The Times provided an agreement can be reached with the unions.
- 24 January – A Labour Party conference at Wembley votes for election of the party leader by electoral college with 40% votes for unions, 30% Labour MPs and 30% constituencies.
- 25 January – The Limehouse Declaration: four right-wing Labour MPs, Shirley Williams, Roy Jenkins, Bill Rodgers and David Owen (the "Gang of Four"), announce plans to form a separate political party – the Social Democratic Party (SDP). On 26 January, nine more Labour MPs declare their support for the new party.
- 26 January – Sir Keith Joseph, Secretary of State for Industry, announces further financial support for British Leyland.
- 27 January – Bill Rodgers resigns from the Shadow Cabinet following his defection to the newly formed SDP. He is replaced by Tony Benn.
- 28 January
  - Sir Hugh Fraser is removed as Chairman of the House of Fraser.
  - Fresh damage is caused in cells at HM Prison Maze in Northern Ireland.
- 29 January – The UK Government welcomes plans by the Japanese car firm Nissan to build Datsun cars in Britain.
- 30 January – David Owen tells his constituency party that he will not stand again as Labour candidate.

=== February ===
- 2 February – The report on the Brixton prison escape is released and the Governor is transferred to an administrative post.
- 4 February – Margaret Thatcher announces that the Government will sell half of its shares in British Aerospace.
- 5 February – Actor Lord Laurence Olivier, cancer researcher Sir Peter Medawar and humanitarian Leonard Cheshire are admitted into the Order of Merit as announced in the New Year Honours list.
- 6 February
  - The Liverpool-registered coal ship Nellie M is bombed and sunk by an IRA unit driving a hijacked pilot boat in Lough Foyle.
  - The Government drops two controversial clauses of the Nationality Bill.
  - The Canadian Minister warns British MPs against delaying changes in the Canadian constitution.
- 9 February – Shirley Williams resigns from Labour's national executive committee.
- 11 February – Closure of the Talbot car plant in Linwood, Scotland, is announced.
- 12 February
  - Purchase of The Times and The Sunday Times from The Thomson Corporation by Rupert Murdoch's News International is confirmed. Murdoch also announces that an agreement with the unions has been reached about manning levels and new technology.
  - Ian Paisley is suspended from the House of Commons for four days after calling the Northern Ireland Secretary a liar.
  - The National Union of Students calls off a 5-week strike.
- 13 February – The National Coal Board announces widespread pit closures.
- 15 February – The first Sunday games of the Football League take place.
- 16 February – Two are jailed in connection with the death of industrialist Thomas Niedermayer.
- 17 February – Princess Anne is elected Chancellor of London University.
- 18 February
  - The Government withdraws plans to close 23 mines after negotiations with the National Union of Mineworkers.
  - Harold Evans is appointed editor of The Times.
- 20 February
  - Four more MPs announce their intention to leave the Labour Party.
  - Peter Sutcliffe is charged with the murder of thirteen women in the north of England.
- 21 February – 30,000 people march in an unemployment protest in Glasgow.
- 24 February – The engagement of the 32-year-old Prince of Wales (now Charles III), and 19-year-old Lady Diana Spencer is officially announced.
- 25 February
  - Margaret Thatcher arrives in Washington, D.C., for a four-day visit with U.S. President Ronald Reagan.
  - The Observer is taken over by "Tiny" Rowland, head of Lonrho.
- 26 February
  - The English cricket team withdraws from the Second Test after the Guyanese government serves a deportation order on Robin Jackman.
  - El Salvador dominates the first day of talks between Thatcher and Reagan.
- 27 February
  - Three British missionaries released from Iran land in Athens.
  - Sir Harold Wilson, former Prime Minister (1964–70, 1974–76) announces his retirement from Parliament at the next general election.
  - The Archbishop of Canterbury advises the church to see homosexuality as a handicap not a sin.
  - The Observer takeover is referred to the Monopolies Commission.

=== March ===
- 3 March – Homebase opens its first DIY and garden centre superstore, at Croydon, Surrey.
- 5 March – The ZX81, a pioneering British home computer, is launched by Sinclair Research, going on to sell over 1.5 million units worldwide.
- 9 March
  - John Lambe, a 37-year-old lorry driver, is sentenced to life imprisonment for the rape of twelve women in the space of less than four years.
  - Thousands of civil servants hold a one-day strike over pay.
- 17 March – The Conservative Government's budget is met with uproar due to further public spending cuts.
- 21 March
  - Home Secretary William Whitelaw allows Wolverhampton council to place a fourteen-day ban on political marches in the West Midlands town, which has a growing problem of militant race riots and was faced with the threat of a National Front march in two days time.
  - After seven years and the longest time playing the title role, Tom Baker leaves Doctor Who and is replaced by Peter Davison in the final episode of Logopolis.
  - Unemployment now stands at 2,400,000 or 10% of the workforce.
  - Motorcycle racer Mike Hailwood, known as 'Mike the Bike' and fourteen times winner of the Isle of Man TT, is seriously injured in a car crash at Tanworth-in-Arden in Warwickshire; he dies of his injuries two days later.
- 22 March – It is reported that a minority of Conservative MPs are planning to challenge the leadership of Margaret Thatcher in an attempt to reverse the party's declining popularity and fight off the challenge from Labour and the SDP.
- 23 March – The Government imposes a ban on animal transportation on the Isle of Wight and southern Hampshire after an outbreak of foot and mouth disease in cattle.
- 24 March – Barbados police rescue Great Train Robber Ronnie Biggs after his kidnapping in Brazil.
- 26 March – Social Democratic Party formed by the so-called "Gang of Four": Shirley Williams, Bill Rodgers, Roy Jenkins, and David Owen, who have all defected from the Labour Party.
- 28 March – Enoch Powell, Ulster Unionist MP (formerly a Conservative until 1974) warns of "racial civil war" in Britain.
- 29 March – The first London Marathon is held.
- 30 March – Academy Award-winning film Chariots of Fire released.

=== April ===
- 2 April – The effects of the recession continue to claim jobs as Midland Red, the iconic Birmingham-based bus operator, closes down its headquarters in the city with the loss of some 170 jobs.
- 4 April
  - Bucks Fizz representing the United Kingdom win the Eurovision Song Contest with the song Making Your Mind Up.
  - Susan Brown, a 23-year-old Biology student at Oxford University, becomes the first female cox in a winning Boat Race crew.
  - Bob Champion, a 32-year-old cancer survivor, is the popular winner of the Grand National with his horse Aldaniti.
- 5 April – The 1981 UK Census is conducted.
- 10 April – Bobby Sands, an IRA member on hunger strike in the Maze prison, Northern Ireland, is elected MP for Fermanagh and South Tyrone in a by election.
- 11 April – More than 300 people (most of them police officers) are injured and extensive damage is caused to property in the Brixton riot.
- 13 April
  - Home Secretary William Whitelaw announces a public inquiry, to be conducted by Lord Scarman, into the disturbances in Brixton.
  - Enoch Powell warns that Britain "has seen nothing yet" with regards to racial unrest.
  - Further rioting breaks out in Brixton.
- 20 April
  - 23-year-old Steve Davis wins the World Snooker Championship for the first time.
  - More than 100 people are arrested and 15 police officers are injured in clashes with black youths in the Finsbury Park, Forest Green and Ealing areas of London.
- 21 April – The county administrative headquarters of Northumberland move from Newcastle upon Tyne to Morpeth.
- 23 April – Unemployment passes the 2,500,000 mark for the first time in nearly 50 years.
- 29 April – Peter Sutcliffe admits to the manslaughter of 13 women on the grounds of diminished responsibility, but the judge rules that a jury should rule on Sutcliffe's state of mind before deciding whether to accept his plea or find him guilty of murder.

=== May ===
- May – Peugeot closes the Talbot car plant at Linwood, Scotland which was opened by the Rootes Group 18 years ago as Scotland's only car factory. The closure of the factory also results in the end of the last remaining Rootes-developed product, the Avenger, after 11 years, as well as the four-year-old Sunbeam supermini. There are no plans to replace the Avenger, but a French-built small car based on the Peugeot 104 will replace the Sunbeam in the next few months.
- 5 May
  - Bobby Sands, a 27-year-old republican, dies in Northern Ireland's Maze Prison after a 66-day hunger strike.
  - The trial of Peter Sutcliffe begins at the Old Bailey; he stands charged with 13 murders and seven attempted murders dating back to 1975.
- 7 May – Ken Livingstone becomes leader of the GLC after Labour wins the GLC elections.
- 9 May – The 100th FA Cup final ends with a 1–1 draw between Manchester City and Tottenham Hotspur at Wembley Stadium.
- 11 May – The first performance of the Andrew Lloyd Webber musical Cats takes place at the New London Theatre.
- 12 May – Francis Hughes (aged 25) becomes the second IRA hunger striker to die in Northern Ireland.
- 13 May – An inquest returns an open verdict on the thirteen people who died as a result of their injuries in the New Cross fire.
- 14 May – Tottenham Hotspur win the FA Cup for the sixth time in their history with a 3–2 win over Manchester City in the final replay at Wembley.
- 15 May
  - The inquiry into the Brixton riots opens.
  - the Queen's second grandchild, a girl, is born to Princess Anne and her husband Capt Mark Phillips.
- 19 May – Peter Sutcliffe is found guilty of being the Yorkshire Ripper after admitting 13 charges of murder and a further seven of attempted murder. He will be sentenced later this week.
- 21 May – The IRA hunger strike death toll reaches four with the deaths of Raymond McCreesh and Patrick O'Hara.
- 22 May – Peter Sutcliffe is sentenced to life imprisonment with a recommendation that he should serve at least 30 years before parole can be considered.
- 27 May – Liverpool F.C. win the European Cup for the third time by defeating Real Madrid of Spain 1–0 in the final at Parc des Princes in Paris. Alan Kennedy scores the only goal of the game. Although they have yet to equal Spanish side Real Madrid's record of six European Cups, they are the first British side to win the trophy three times.
- 30 May – More than 100,000 people from across Britain march to Trafalgar Square in London for the TUC's March For Jobs.

=== June ===
- 3 June – Shergar wins the Epsom Derby.
- 9 June – King Khaled of Saudi Arabia arrives in Britain on a state visit.
- 11 June
  - The NatWest Tower (later known as Tower 42) is formally opened by the Queen.
  - Britain's first Urban Enterprise Zone is created in Lower Swansea Valley, Wales.
- 13 June – Marcus Sarjeant fires six blank cartridges at the Queen as she enters Horse Guards Parade.
- 13–14 June – More than 80 arrests are made during clashes between white power skinheads and black people in Coventry, where the National Front is planning a march later this month, on the same day as an anti-racist concert by The Specials.
- 15 June – Lord Scarman opens an enquiry into the Brixton riots.
- 16 June – Liberal Party and SDP form an electoral pact – the SDP-Liberal Alliance.
- 17 June – General and war hero Sir Richard O'Connor dies in London shortly before his 92nd birthday.
- 20 June
  - Rioting breaks out in Peckham, South London.
  - HMS Ark Royal is launched.
- 21 June – A fire at Goodge Street tube station kills one person and injures 16.
- 23 June – Unemployment reaches 2,680,977 (one in nine of the workforce), and Margaret Thatcher is warned that a further rise is likely.
- 24 June – The twelfth James Bond film – For Your Eyes Only – is released in UK cinemas. It is the fifth of seven films to star Roger Moore as James Bond and the final Bond film to be solely distributed by United Artists.
- 26 June – A Hawker Siddeley HS 748 operated by Dan-Air on a night mail flight crashes near Nailstone in Leicestershire, killing all three on board.

=== July ===
- 2 July – Four members of an Asian Muslim family (three of them children) are killed by arson at their home in Walthamstow, London; the attack is believed to have been racially motivated.
- 3 July – Hundreds of Asians and skinheads riot in Southall, London, following disturbances at the Hamborough Tavern public house, which is severely damaged by fire.
- 5 July – Toxteth riots break out in Liverpool and first use is made of CS gas by British police. Less serious riots occur in the Handsworth district of Birmingham as well as Wolverhampton city centre, parts of Coventry, Leicester and Derby, and also in the Buckinghamshire town High Wycombe.
- 7 July – 43 people are charged with theft and violent disorder following a riot in Wood Green, North London.
- 8 July
  - Joe McDonnell becomes the fifth IRA hunger striker to die.
  - Inner-city rioting continues when a riot in Moss Side, Manchester, sees more than 1,000 people besiege the local police station. However, the worst rioting in Toxteth has now ended.
  - British Leyland ends production of the Austin Maxi, one of its longest-running cars, after 12 years.
- 9 July – Rioting breaks out in Woolwich, London.
- 10 July
  - Rioting breaks out in London, Birmingham, Leeds, Leicester, Ellesmere Port, Luton, Sheffield, Portsmouth, Preston, Newcastle-upon-Tyne, Derby, Southampton, Nottingham, High Wycombe, Bedford, Edinburgh, Wolverhampton, Stockport, Blackburn, Huddersfield, Reading, Chester and Aldershot.
  - Two days of rioting in Moss Side, Manchester, draw to a close, during which there has been extensive looting of shops. Princess Road, the main road through the area, will be closed for several days while adjacent buildings and gas mains damaged by rioting and arson are made safe.
- 11 July – A further wave of rioting breaks out in Bradford, West Yorkshire.
- 13 July
  - The IRA hunger strike death toll reaches six when Martin Hurson dies.
  - Margaret Thatcher announces that police will be able to use rubber bullets, water cannons and armoured vehicles against urban rioters. Labour leader Michael Foot blames the recent wave of rioting on the Conservative government's economic policies, which have seen unemployment rise by more than 70% in the last two years.
- 15 July – Police clash with black youths in Brixton once again, this time after police raid properties in search of petrol bombs which are never found.
- 16 July – Labour narrowly hang on to the Warrington seat in a by-election, fighting off a strong challenge from Roy Jenkins for the Social Democratic Party.
- 17 July – Official opening of the Humber Bridge by the Queen.
- 20 July – Michael Heseltine tours Merseyside to examine the problems in the area, which has been particularly badly hit by the current recession.
- 25 July – Around 1,000 motorcyclists clash with police in Keswick, Cumbria.
- 27 July
  - British Telecommunications Act separates British Telecom from the Royal Mail with effect from 1 October.
  - The two-month-old daughter of Princess Anne and her husband Capt Mark Phillips is christened Zara Anne Elizabeth.
- 28 July – Margaret Thatcher blames IRA leaders for the recent IRA hunger striker deaths.
- 29 July – The wedding of Prince Charles and Lady Diana Spencer takes place at St Paul's Cathedral. More than 30 million viewers watch the wedding on television – the second highest television audience of all time in Britain.

=== August ===
- Unknown date – Japanese carmaker Suzuki follows up the British success of its motorcycles by importing passenger cars to Britain for the first time, with first imported model being the Suzuki Alto, a small hatchback available with three or five doors and marketed as a competitor for the Mini and Citroen 2CV.
- 1 August – Kevin Lynch becomes the seventh IRA hunger striker to die.
- 2 August – Within 24 hours of Kevin Lynch's death, Kieran Doherty becomes the eighth IRA hunger striker to die.
- 8 August – The IRA hunger strike claims its ninth hunger striker so far (and its third in a week) with the death of Thomas McElwee.
- 9 August – Broadmoor Hospital falls under heavy criticism after the escape of a second prisoner in three weeks. The latest absconder is 32-year-old Alan Reeve, a convicted double murderer.
- 17 August – An inquiry opens in the Moss Side riots.
- 20 August
  - The tenth IRA hunger striker, Michael Devine, dies in prison.
  - Inflation has fallen to 10.9% – the lowest under this government.
  - Minimum Lending Rate ceases to be set by the Bank of England.
- 24 August – Mark David Chapman is sentenced to 20 years to life in prison for killing John Lennon.
- 25 August – Britain's largest Enterprise Zone is launched on deindustrialised land on Tyneside.
- 26 August – Vauxhall launches the second generation Cavalier, built on General Motors J-Car platform, available for the first time with front-wheel drive and a hatchback.
- 27 August – Moira Stuart, 31, is appointed the BBC's first black newsreader.

=== September ===
- September – Little Miss Bossy, the first book in the Little Miss series (the female counterpart to the Mr. Men series) is first published.
- 1 September – Filling stations start selling motor fuel by the litre.
- 8 September
  - Greenham Common Women's Peace Camp set up by women who have walked from Cardiff to RAF Greenham Common to protest at plans to site US nuclear missiles there.
  - Sixteen Islington Labour councillors join the SDP following the defection of Labour MP Michael O'Halloran.
  - The first episode of the long-running and iconic sitcom Only Fools and Horses is broadcast on BBC1.
- 10 September – Another Enterprise Zone is launched, the latest being in Wakefield, West Yorkshire.
- 14 September – Cecil Parkinson is appointed chairman of the Conservative Party.
- 16 September – The children's series Postman Pat is first broadcast on BBC1.
- 17 September – A team of divers begins removing gold ingots worth £40 million from the wreck of HMS Edinburgh, sunk off the coast of Norway in 1942.
- 18 September – David Steel tells delegates at the Liberal Party conference to "go back to your constituencies and prepare for government", hopes of which are boosted by the fact that most opinion polls now show the SDP-Liberal Alliance in the lead.
- 21 September – Belize is granted independence
- 23 September – Vauxhall launch their successful replacement for the Cavalier Mk1 the Cavalier Mk2.
- 25 September – Ford announces that its best-selling Cortina will be discontinued next year and its replacement will be called the Sierra.
- 29 September – Football mourns the legendary former Liverpool manager Bill Shankly, who dies that day at the age of 68 after suffering a heart attack.

=== October ===
- 1 October – Bryan Robson, 24-year-old midfielder, becomes Britain's most expensive footballer in a £1.5million move from West Bromwich Albion to Manchester United.
- 3 October – Hunger strikes at the Maze Prison in Northern Ireland end after seven months. The final six hunger strikers have been without food for between 13 and 55 days.
- 5 October – Depeche Mode release their debut album Speak & Spell.
- 7 October – British Leyland launches the Triumph Acclaim, a four-door small family saloon built in collaboration with Japanese car and motorcycle giant Honda at the Cowley plant in Oxford. It is based on the Japanese Honda Ballade (not available in Britain), has front-wheel drive, is powered by a 1.3-litre 70 bhp petrol engine and is between the Ford Escort and Ford Cortina in terms of size.
- 10 October – Chelsea Barracks bombed by the Provisional Irish Republican Army, killing two people.
- 12 October – British Leyland announces the closure of three factories – a move which will cost nearly 3,000 people their jobs.
- 12 October – 22 December – Original run of Granada Television serial Brideshead Revisited.
- 13 October – Opinion polls show that Margaret Thatcher is still unpopular as Conservative leader due to her anti-inflationary economic measures, which have now come under fire from her predecessor Edward Heath.
- 15 October – Norman Tebbit tells fellow Conservative MPs: "I grew up in the thirties with an unemployed father. He didn't riot. He got on his bike and looked for work and he kept looking until he found it".
- 19 October
  - British Telecom announces that the telegram will be discontinued next year after 139 years in use.
  - Scottish Celtic footballer Johnny Doyle, 30, is accidentally electrocuted while building his new home.
- 22 October
  - The case of Dudgeon v United Kingdom is decided by the European Court of Human Rights, which rules that the continued existence of laws in Northern Ireland criminalising consensual gay sex is in contravention of the European Convention on Human Rights.
  - The Croydon North West by-election takes place following the death of the sitting Conservative MP Robert Taylor on 18 June; the Liberal candidate Bill Pitt wins with a large majority.
- 23 October – The Liberal-SDP Alliance tops a MORI poll on 40%, putting them ahead of Labour on 31% and the Conservatives on 27%.
- 24 October – CND anti-nuclear march in London attracts over 250,000 people.
- 26 October – Rock band Queen release their Greatest Hits compilation album; it becomes the all-time best-selling album in the United Kingdom.
- 29 October – A patient dies of pneumocystis pneumonia at the Royal Brompton Hospital, London. He is the first person (patient zero) in the UK to die of an AIDS related illness. An investigation by ITN in 2021 will identify him as John Eaddie of Bournemouth.
- 30 October – Nicholas Reed, chief of the Euthanasia charity Exit, is jailed for 2 1/2 years for aiding and abetting suicides.

=== November ===
- 1 November
  - The West Indian island nation of Antigua and Barbuda becomes independent of the United Kingdom.
  - British Leyland's 58,000-strong workforce begins a strike over pay.
- 2 November – The TV licence increases in price from £34 to £46 for a colour TV, and £12 to £15 for black and white.
- 13 November – The Queen opens the final phase of the Telford Shopping Centre, nearly a decade after development began on the first phase of what is now one of the largest indoor shopping centres in Europe in the Shropshire new town.
- 16 November – Production of the Vauxhall Astra commences in Britain at the Ellesmere Port plant in Cheshire. The Astra was launched a year ago but until now has been produced solely at the Opel plant in West Germany.
- 18 November – The England national football team beats Hungary 1–0 at Wembley Stadium to qualify for the World Cup in Spain next summer, with the only goal being scored by Ipswich Town striker Paul Mariner. It is the first time they have qualified for the tournament since 1970.
- 23 November – 1981 United Kingdom tornado outbreak, the largest recorded tornado outbreak in European history.
- 25 November – A report into the Brixton Riots, which scarred inner-city London earlier this year, points the finger of blame at the social and economic problems which have been plaguing Brixton and many other inner-city areas across England.
- 26 November – The Crosby by-election, caused by the death of the sitting MP Graham Page on 1 October, is held; Shirley Williams wins the seat for the SDP, overturning a Conservative majority of nearly 20,000 votes.

=== December ===
- 8 December
  - Severe snow storms hit the UK as temperatures plummet to the lowest in any December on record since 1874 and the heaviest snow falls since 1878. The snow storms continue in waves until 26/27 December.
  - Arthur Scargill becomes leader of the National Union of Mineworkers.
- 9 December – Michael Heseltine announces a £95 million aid package for the inner cities.
- 11 December – Seer Green rail crash: a train crash in Seer Green near Gerrards Cross, Buckinghamshire kills four people and seriously injures five others. The crash was caused by a combination of the severe blizzards and human error.
- 12 December – The first case of AIDS in the UK is diagnosed.
- 19 December – An opinion poll shows that Margaret Thatcher is now the most unpopular postwar British prime minister and that the SDP-Liberal Alliance has the support of up to 50% of the electorate.
- 19 December – Penlee lifeboat disaster: The crew of the MV Union Star and the life-boat Solomon Browne sent to rescue them are all killed in heavy seas off Cornwall; some of the bodies are never found.

=== Undated ===
- Inflation has fallen to 11.9%, the second lowest annual level since 1973, but has been largely achieved by the mass closure of heavy industry facilities that have contributed to the highest postwar levels of unemployment.
- In spite of the continuing rise in employment, the British economy improves from 4% contraction last year to 0.8% overall growth this year.
- First Urban Development Corporations set up in London Docklands and Merseyside.
- First purpose-built Hindu temple in the British Isles formally opens in Slough.
- The London department store Whiteleys closes, after 107 years in business.
- Last manufacture of coal gas, at Millport, Isle of Cumbrae.
- Perrier Comedy Awards first presented to the best shows on the Edinburgh Festival Fringe.
- Suzuki, the Japanese manufacturer famous for producing motorcycles, imports passenger cars to the United Kingdom for the first time. The first model sold in Britain is the entry-level Alto, with the SJ four-wheel drive set to go on sale in 1982.
- In spite of the continued rise in unemployment, the British economy improved with 1.8% overall growth for the year compared to 3% overall contraction in 1980.
- New car sales in the United Kingdom fall to just over 1.4 million. The Ford Cortina enjoys its 10th year as Britain's best-selling car since 1967, while the new front-wheel drive Ford Escort is close behind in second place. British Leyland's new Metro is Britain's fourth most popular new car with nearly 100,000 sales. The Datsun Cherry, eighth in the sales charts, is the most popular foreign car in Britain this year.

== Publications ==
- Alasdair Gray's novel Lanark: A Life in Four Books.
- Terry Pratchett's novel Strata.
- Salman Rushdie's novel Midnight's Children.
- D. M. Thomas' novel The White Hotel.
- Roger Hargreaves' children's book Little Miss Bossy, first of the Little Miss series (the female counterpart to the Mr. Men series).

== Births ==
- 6 January – Andrew Britton, novelist (died 2008)
- 11 January
  - Jamelia, singer
  - Tom Meighan, singer-songwriter
- 19 January – Thaila Zucchi, singer and actress
- 22 January
  - Richard Butcher, footballer (died 2011)
  - Guy Wilks, rally driver
- 25 January – Alex Partridge, rower
- 29 January – Rachna Khatau, actress
- 30 January – Peter Crouch, footballer
- 31 January – Gemma Collins, media personality and businesswoman
- 1 February – Rob Austin, racing driver
- 8 February – Ralf Little, actor and footballer
- 9 February – Tom Hiddleston, actor
- 10 February – Holly Willoughby, television presenter
- 16 February – Alison Rowatt, Scottish field hockey midfielder
- 17 February – Andrew Stephenson, politician
- 26 March – Tim Dunn, British railway historian, TV presenter, geographer and travel editor
- 27 March – Terry McFlynn, Northern Irish footballer
- 1 April – Hannah Spearritt, pop singer (S Club 7) and actress
- 3 April – Arfius Arf, artist
- 10 April – Liz McClarnon, pop singer (Atomic Kitten)
- 23 April – Gemma Whelan, actress and comedian
- 25 April – John McFall, paralympic sprinter
- 3 May – Charlie Brooks, actress
- 5 May – Craig David, singer
- 13 May – Luciana Berger, Labour Member of Parliament
- 15 May – Zara Phillips, equestrienne, daughter of Anne, Princess Royal
- 16 May
  - Joseph Morgan, actor
  - Jim Sturgess, actor
- 17 May – Leon Osman, footballer
- 20 May – Sean Conlon, musician (5ive)
- 22 May – Sara Pascoe, writer and comedian
- 26 May – James Wong, ethnobotanist, broadcaster and garden designer
- 29 May – Rochelle Clark, English rugby union player
- 9 June
  - Helen Don-Duncan, English backstroke swimmer (died 2023)
  - Alex Neil, Scottish football player and manager
  - Anoushka Shankar, sitar player
- 11 June – Alistair McGregor, Scottish field hockey goalkeeper
- 23 June – Antony Costa, singer
- 25 June – Sheridan Smith, actress
- 27 June – Sam Hoare, actor and director
- 28 June – Joanne Ellis, field hockey midfielder
- 30 June – Tom Burke, actor
- 9 July – Jamie Thomas King, actor
- 14 July – Lee Mead, actor and singer
- 8 August – Bradley McIntosh, pop singer (S Club 7)
- 11 August – Sandi Thom, Scottish singer & songwriter
- 17 August
  - Johnny Mercer, army officer and Conservative Member of Parliament
  - Chris New, actor
- 20 August – Ben Barnes, actor (Prince Caspian)
- 27 August – Olivia Lee, comedian, actress and writer
- 28 August – Kezia Dugdale, Scottish Labour leader
- 2 September – Chris Tremlett, cricketer
- 3 September – Fearne Cotton, television presenter
- 7 September – Natalie McGarry, SNP Member of Parliament convicted of embezzlement
- 11 September – Mark Rhodes, singer, runner up from Pop Idol series 2 and TV host
- 15 September – Richard Alexander, English field hockey defender
- 16 September – David Mitchell, Scottish field hockey defender
- 21 September – Sarah Whatmore, English singer-songwriter
- 23 September – Helen Richardson, field hockey defender
- 29 September – Suzanne Shaw, actress and singer (Hear'Say)
- 1 October – Deborah James, journalist and cancer campaigner (died 2022)
- 9 October
  - Rupert Friend, actor, producer and screenwriter
  - Jess Phillips, politician
- 10 October – Stinson Hunter, filmmaker and journalist
- 13 October
  - Ryan Ashford, footballer
  - Kele Okereke, singer and guitarist (Bloc Party)
- 25 October – Shaun Wright-Phillips, footballer
- 31 October – Kate Granger, physician and fundraiser (died 2016)
- 4 November – Guy Martin, motorcycle rider and television presenter
- 7 November – George Pilkington, footballer
- 13 November – Tom Ferrier, racing driver
- 15 November – Jared O'Mara, politician and fraudster
- 17 November – Sarah Harding, pop singer (Girls Aloud) (died 2021)
- 20 November
  - Scott Hutchison, Scottish singer-songwriter and guitarist (died 2018)
  - Andrea Riseborough, actress
  - Kimberley Walsh, singer
- 26 November – Natasha Bedingfield, singer
- 27 November – Gary Lucy, actor and model
- 29 November – Tom Hurndall, photographer (died 2004)
- 30 November – Lisa Head, soldier (died 2011)
- 1 December – Kathryn Drysdale, actress
- 9 December – Gemma Fay, Scottish international football goalkeeper
- 15 December
  - Michelle Dockery, actress
  - Victoria Summer, actress
- 21 December – Sajid Mahmood, English cricketer
- 28 December – Frank Turner, punk and folk singer-songwriter
- 29 December – Charlotte Riley, actress
- Undated – Sunjeev Sahota, novelist

== Deaths ==
=== January ===
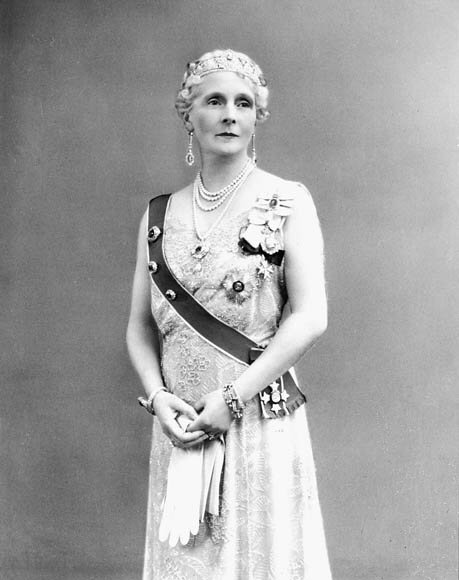
Princess Alice, Countess of Athlone

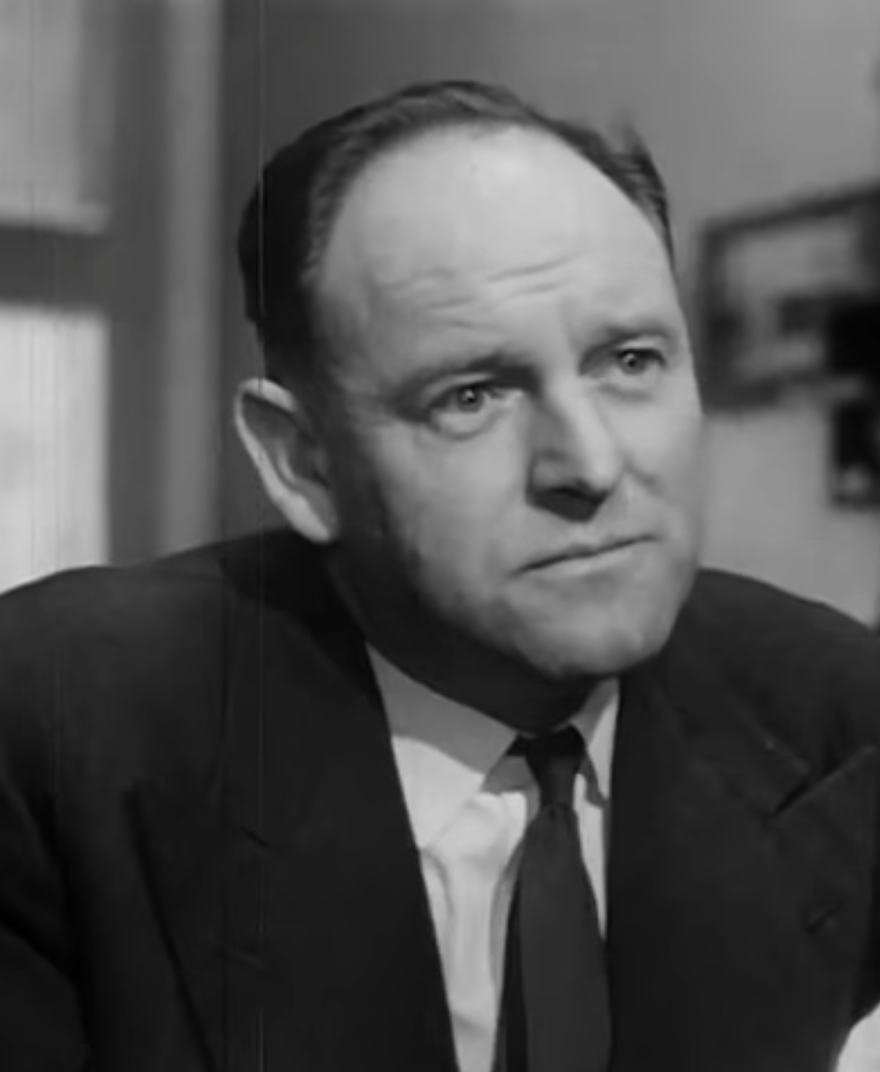
Bernard Lee

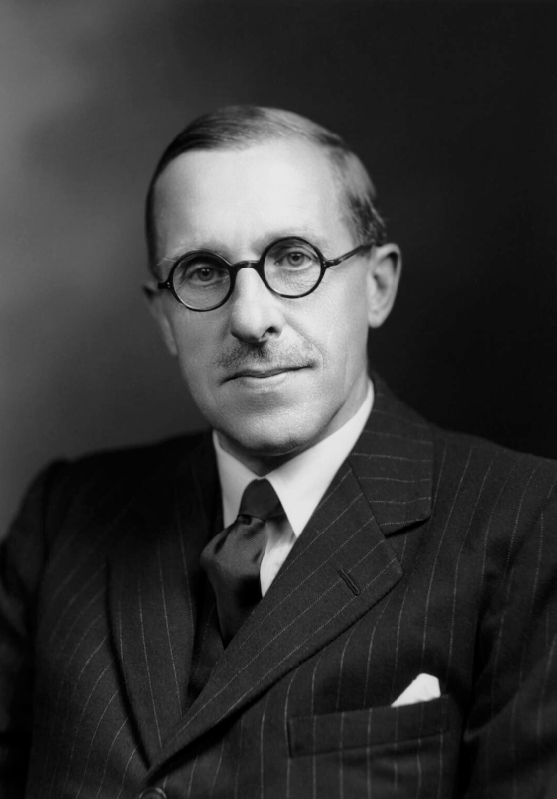
Derick Heathcoat-Amory, 1st Viscount Amory

- 1 January – Sir John Stacey, RAF air chief marshal (born 1924)
- 2 January – Victor Carin, actor (born 1933)
- 3 January
  - Princess Alice, Countess of Athlone, member of the royal family (born 1883)
  - Edith Marguerite Harrington, grandmother of Queen Camilla (born 1893)
- 4 January – Gordon Charles Steele, Royal Navy captain and Victoria Cross recipient (born 1891)
- 5 January – Sir James Martin, aircraft engineer (born 1903, Ireland)
- 6 January
  - Ernestine Bowes-Lyon, aristocrat and cousin of the Queen Mother (born 1891)
  - A. J. Cronin, Scottish novelist (born 1896)
  - Tom Litterick, politician (born 1929)
- 7 January – Alvar Lidell, broadcaster and journalist (born 1908)
- 9 January
  - Ronald Brittain, Army sergeant-major (born 1899)
  - Sammy Davies, racing driver (born 1887)
  - William MacTaggart, Scottish artist (born 1903)
- 11 January
  - Hubert Hunt, World War I air ace (born 1898)
  - Malcolm MacDonald, politician and diplomat, son of Ramsay MacDonald (born 1901)
- 12 January
  - Isobel Elsom, actress (born 1893)
  - Sir John Fearns Nicoll, colonial administrator (born 1899)
  - Joseph Sparks, trade unionist and politician (born 1901)
- 13 January – Herbert Henry Farmer, Presbyterian minister (born 1892)
- 15 January – Graham Whitehead, racing driver (born 1922)
- 16 January
  - Bernard Lee, actor (born 1908)
  - Lady Delia Peel, courtier (born 1889)
- 17 January
  - Euston Baker, Army brigadier (born 1895)
  - Sir Thomas Jacomb Hutton, Army lieutenant-general (born 1890)
- 18 January – David Stirling Anderson, engineer (born 1895)
- 19 January
  - Eric Boon, boxer (born 1919)
  - Charles Hampton Johnston, politician (born 1919)
  - William John McCallien, geologist (born 1902)
- 20 January – Derick Heathcoat-Amory, 1st Viscount Amory, politician, Chancellor of the Exchequer (1958–1960) (born 1899)
- 21 January
  - Cuth Harrison, racing driver (born 1906)
  - B. T. Hopkins, Welsh poet (born 1897)
  - James Stronge, Northern Irish politician and son of Sir Norman Stronge (murdered by the Provisional IRA) (born 1932)
  - Sir Norman Stronge, 8th Baronet, Northern Irish politician and father of James Stronge (murdered by the Provisional IRA) (born 1894)
  - Tommy Weston, jockey (born 1902)
- 22 January
  - Gladys Vasey, artist (born 1889)
  - Sir Arnold Waters, World War I soldier and Victoria Cross recipient (born 1886)
- 23 January
  - Sir Andrew Shonfield, economist (born 1917)
  - Christopher Simcox, convicted murderer (born 1909)
- 27 January
  - Roger Burford, screenwriter and novelist (born 1904)
  - Brenda Colvin, landscape architect (born 1897)
  - Cecil Davidge, lawyer and academic (born 1901)
- 29 January
  - John Cecil Kelly-Rogers, aviator (born 1905, Ireland)
  - Vernon Stewart Laurie, stockbroker and Army colonel (born 1896)

=== February ===
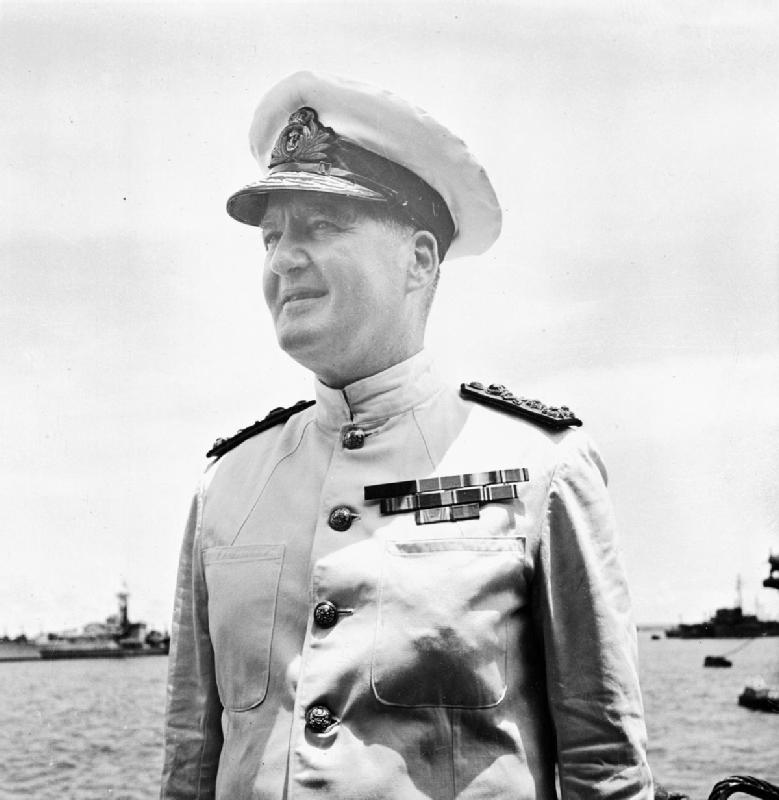
Bruce Fraser, 1st Baron Fraser of North Cape

- 2 February – Jack Parsons, English cricketer (born 1890)
- 4 February
  - Percival Beale, banker, Chief Cashier of the Bank of England (1949–1955) (born 1906)
  - Joan Ingram, tennis player (born 1910)
  - Douglas McAlpine, neurologist (born 1890)
  - Sir John Whitworth-Jones, RAF air chief marshal (born 1896)
- 5 February – Sir William Scotter, Army general (born 1922)
- 6 February – Gilbert Ashton, English cricketer (born 1896)
- 10 February – Sir Hubert Shirley-Smith, civil engineer (born 1901)
- 11 February
  - Sir Charles Daniel, Royal Navy admiral (born 1894)
  - Franz Sondheimer, German-born British-Israeli chemist (born 1926)
- 12 February
  - Murray Deloford, tennis player (born 1916)
  - Bruce Fraser, 1st Baron Fraser of North Cape, admiral in both World Wars (born 1888)
- 13 February – Eric Whelpton, writer, teacher and traveller (born 1894)
- 17 February – David Garnett, writer and publisher (born 1892)
- 18 February – Peter Cavanagh, comic impressionist (born 1914)
- 19 February
  - Islwyn Davies, Anglican priest (born 1909)
  - Olive Gilbert, actress and singer (born 1898)
  - Leonard Plugge, radio entrepreneur and politician (born 1889)
- 20 February – Brian Sellers, English cricketer and manager (born 1907)
- 22 February – Guy Butler, Olympic athlete (born 1899)
- 25 February – Mary Sykes, lawyer and politician (born 1896)
- 26 February
  - Robert Aickman, writer and conservationist (born 1914)
  - Gerald Cross, actor (born 1912)
  - Roger Tonge, actor (born 1946)
  - Sir William Oliver, Army lieutenant-general (born 1901)
- 27 February – Alexander Boyd Stewart, organic chemist (born 1904)
- 28 February – Talbot Rothwell, screenwriter (born 1916)

=== March ===
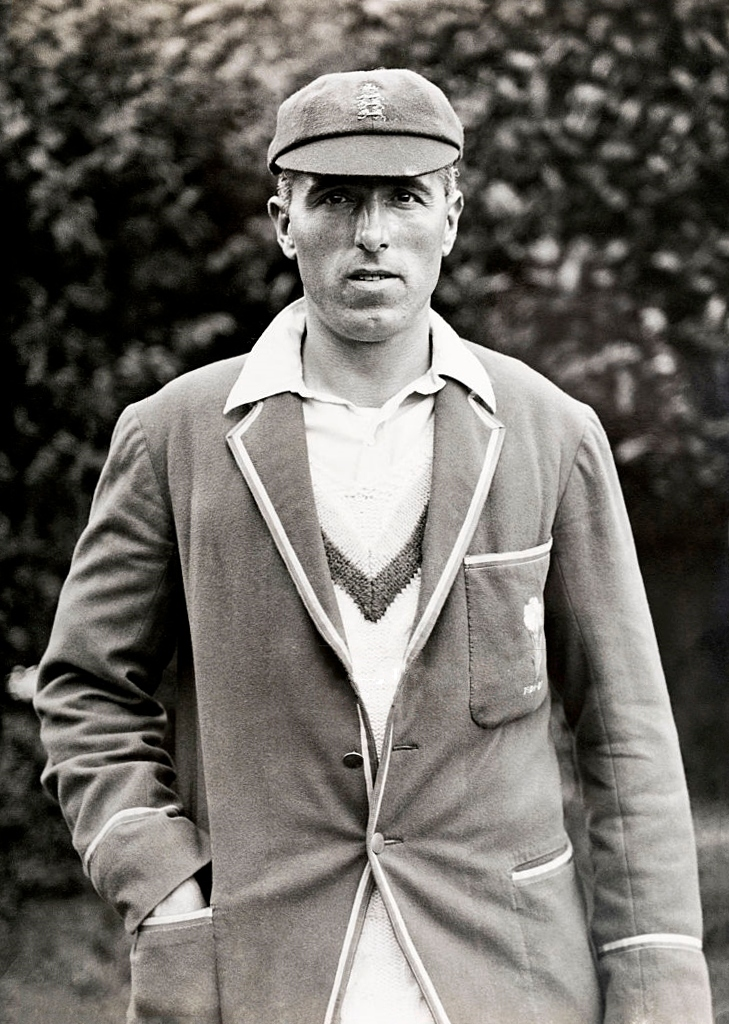
George Geary

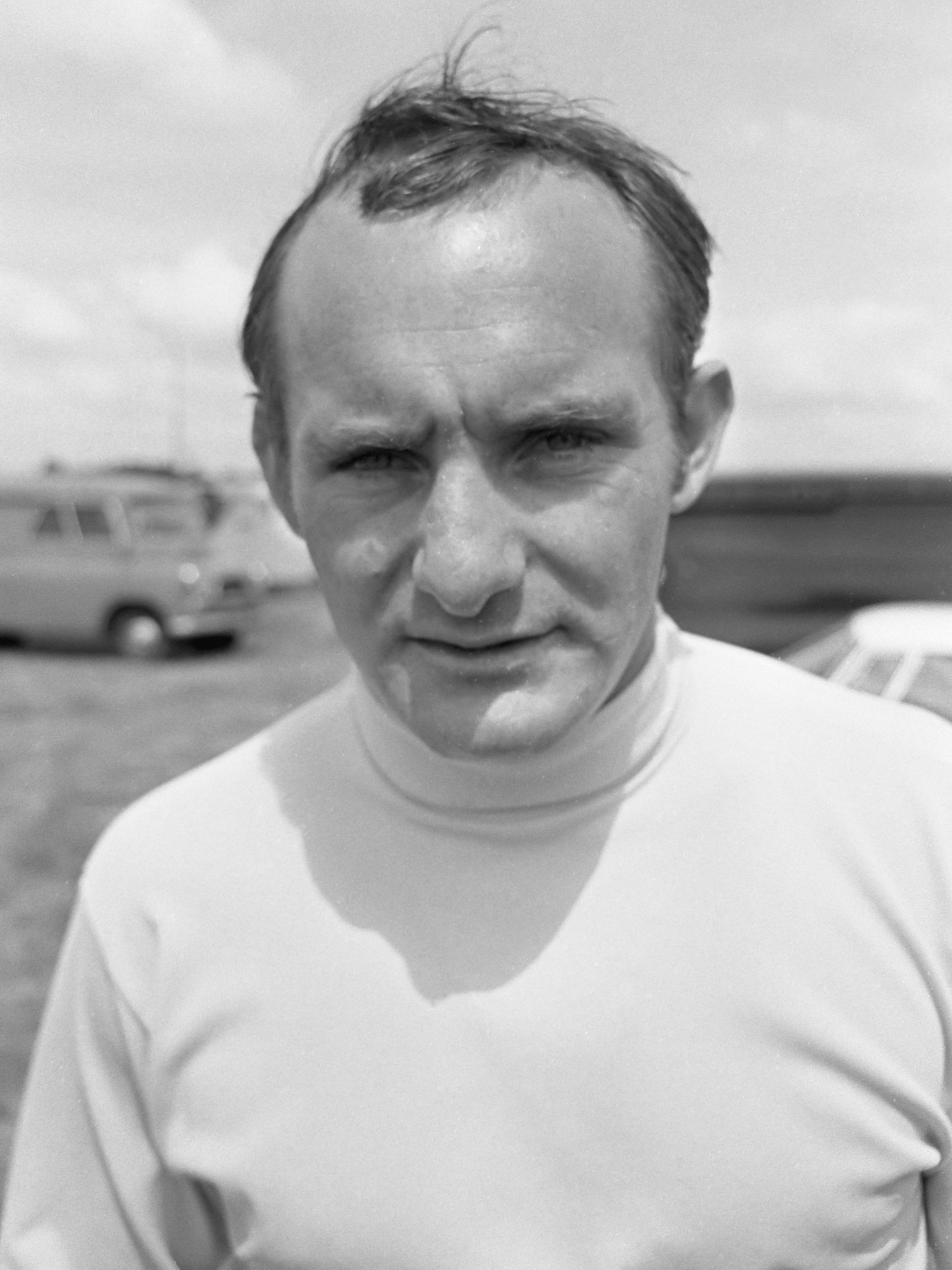
Mike Hailwood

- 1 March – Martyn Lloyd-Jones, Welsh Congregationalist minister and physician (born 1899)
- 4 March
  - Nancy Elder, chess player (born 1915)
  - Ian Engelmann, television producer (born 1933)
  - Torin Thatcher, actor (born 1905)
- 5 March
  - Winifred Nicholson, artist (born 1893)
  - Totti Truman Taylor, actress (born 1915)
- 6 March
  - George Geary, English cricketer (born 1893)
  - Garry Marsh, actor (born 1906)
  - Roland Stobbart, motorcycle racer (born 1909)
- 8 March
  - Nigel Birch, Baron Rhyl, politician (born 1906)
  - Joseph Henry Woodger, biologist (born 1894)
- 10 March
  - Bill Hopkins, composer (born 1943)
  - Lewis Pugh, Army major-general (born 1907)
- 11 March – Sir Maurice Oldfield, intelligence chief (born 1915)
- 12 March – William Denholm Barnetson, newspaper proprietor and television executive (born 1917)
- 13 March
  - Wrey Gardiner, writer and poet (born 1901)
  - Sir Patrick Hennessy, industrialist (born 1898, Ireland)
  - Robin Maugham, 2nd Viscount Maugham, peer and author (born 1916)
- 14 March
  - Ken Barrington, English cricketer (born 1930)
  - Billie Bristow, screenwriter (born 1897)
- 17 March
  - Nicholas Stuart Gray, actor and playwright (born 1922)
  - Q. D. Leavis, literary critic (born 1906)
- 18 March – Pat Mullins, greyhound trainer (born 1929)
- 19 March – John Deane Potter, journalist (born 1912)
- 22 March – Dudley Carew, journalist, writer and critic (born 1903)
- 23 March
  - Sir Claude Auchinleck, field marshal (born 1884; died in Morocco)
  - Mike Hailwood, motorcycle racer (car crash) (born 1940)
  - Beatrice Tinsley, British-born New Zealand astronomer (born 1941)
  - Bob Wall, football administrator (born 1912)
- 24 March – George Charles Gray, organist (born 1897)
- 25 March – Frank Harold Cleobury, Anglican priest (born 1892)
- 26 March – C. D. Darlington, biologist, mycologist and geneticist (born 1903)
- 28 March
  - Gordon Halland, police officer, first commandant of Hendon Police College (born 1888)
  - Bernard Hollowood, writer, cartoonist and economist (born 1910)
  - Helen Adelaide Lamb, artist (born 1893)
- 29 March
  - Clive Sansom, British-born Australian poet (born 1910)
  - David Prophet, racing driver (air accident) (born 1937)
- 30 March – Douglas Lowe, Olympic athlete (born 1902)
- 31 March – Enid Bagnold, author and playwright (born 1889)

=== April ===
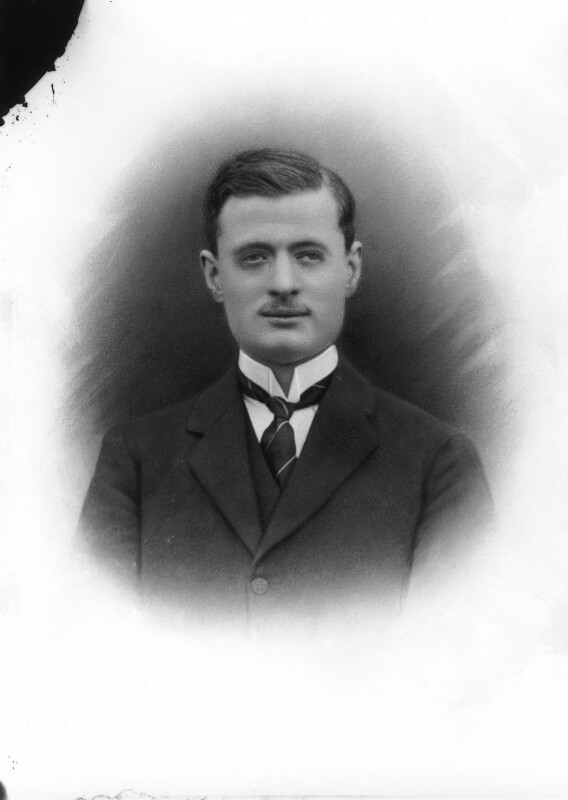
George Cambridge, 2nd Marquess of Cambridge

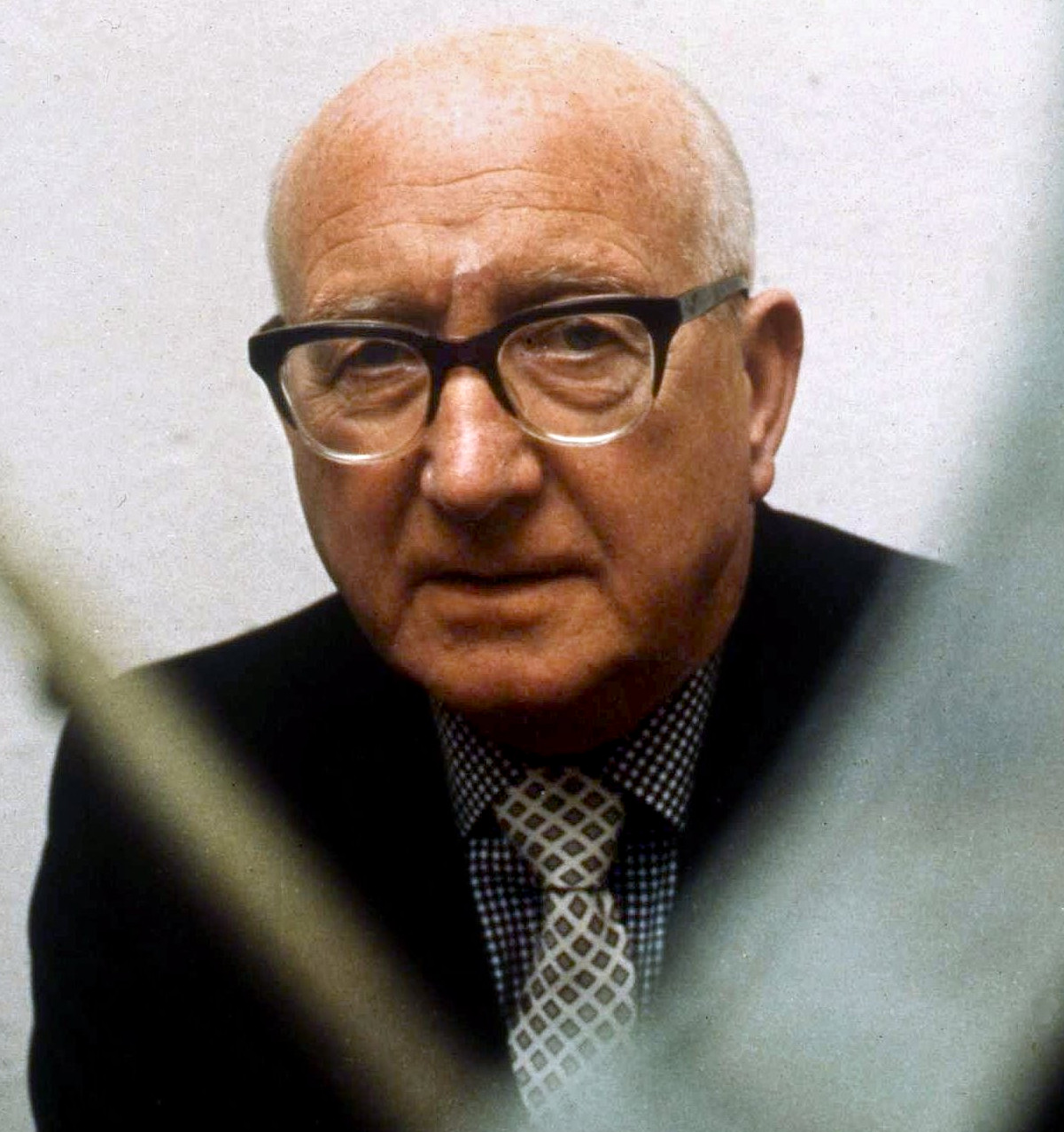
Ivor Newton

- 1 April – Dennis Feltham Jones, science fiction writer (born 1918)
- 3 April – Will Owen, politician (born 1901)
- 4 April – Donald Tyerman, journalist (born 1908)
- 7 April
  - Lorne Carr-Harris, ice hockey player (born 1899)
  - Kit Lambert, record producer (fall) (born 1935)
- 8 April
  - Eric Rogers, film composer (born 1921)
  - Edward Russell, 2nd Baron Russell of Liverpool, peer, lawyer and writer (born 1895)
- 13 April
  - Albert Burdon, actor and comedian (born 1900)
  - Gwyn Thomas, novelist (born 1913)
- 14 April – Christian Darnton, composer (born 1905)
- 15 April – Blake Butler, actor (born 1924)
- 16 April
  - George Cambridge, 2nd Marquess of Cambridge, member of the royal family (born 1895)
  - Peggy Duff, political activist and journalist (born 1910)
  - Eric Hollies, English cricketer (born 1912)
  - J. E. Meredith, Presbyterian minister and writer (born 1904)
  - Sir Gerald Thesiger, judge (born 1902)
- 17 April – Francis Rex Parrington, palaeontologist (born 1905)
- 19 April
  - Irene Baird, British-Canadian novelist and journalist (born 1901)
  - Colin Jackson, politician (born 1921)
- 20 April – John Alan Lyde Caunter, Army brigadier-general (born 1889)
- 21 April
  - Dorothy Eady, antiques caretaker and folklorist (born 1904)
  - Ivor Newton, pianist (born 1892)
  - Lesley Souter, electrical engineer (born 1917)
- 22 April – Philip Rea, 2nd Baron Rea, peer, politician and banker (born 1900)
- 23 April – Sir James Angus Gillan, Olympic rower (born 1885)
- 24 April – J. C. P. Miller, mathematician and computing pioneer (born 1906)
- 25 April – Isaline Blew Horner, Indologist (born 1896)
- 26 April – Robert Garioch, poet and translator (born 1909)
- 28 April
  - Steve Currie, bassist of T. Rex (car accident) (born 1947)
  - Philip Lincoln, RAF air commodore (born 1892)
  - Marjorie Rackstraw, educationalist and social worker (born 1888)
- 29 April
  - Sir Richard Goodbody, Army general (born 1903)
  - Bernard Mason, businessman (born 1895)

=== May ===
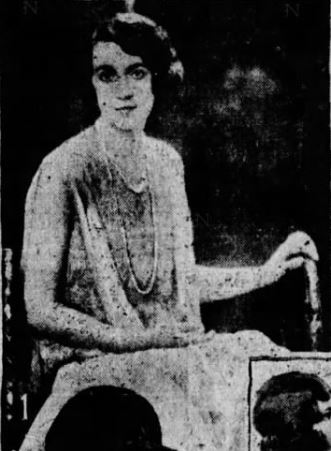
Doris Harcourt

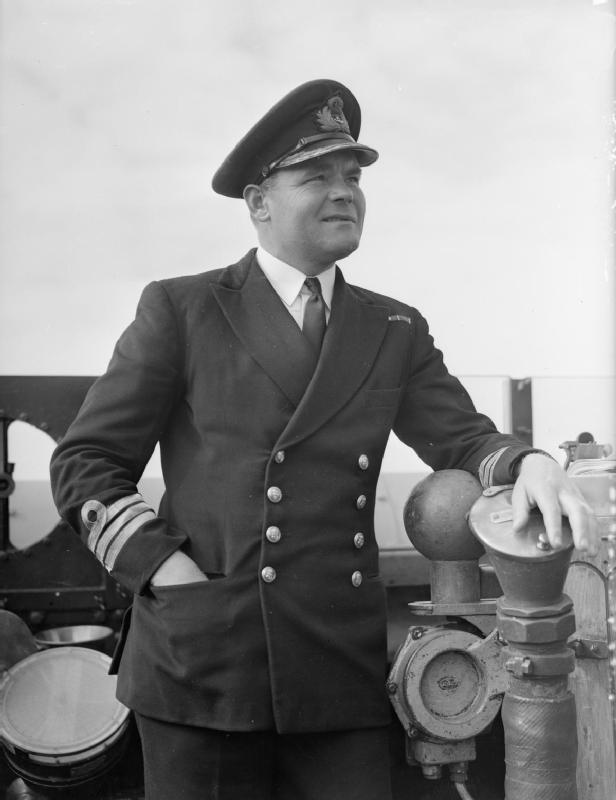
Donald Macintyre

- 1 May – Barry Jones, actor (born 1893)
- 2 May
  - Joseph Foster Cairns, Northern Irish politician (born 1920)
  - Sir Walter Couchman, Royal Navy admiral (born 1905)
- 4 May – Alan William Greenwood, zoologist and geneticist (born 1897)
- 5 May
  - Sir Martin Lindsay, 1st Baronet, polar explorer and Army colonel (born 1905)
  - Bobby Sands, volunteer in the Provisional Irish Republican Army and member of parliament (born 1954; died in 1981 Irish hunger strike)
- 6 May – Gordon Parry, film director (born 1908)
- 9 May
  - Ralph Allen, footballer (born 1906)
  - Doris Harcourt, socialite (born 1900)
  - Lechmere Thomas, Army major-general (born 1897)
- 10 May – Geoffrey Stevens, politician (born 1902)
- 15 May – Margery Corbett Ashby, politician (born 1882)
- 16 May – Keith Murray, ceramic and glass artist (born 1892, New Zealand)
- 17 May
  - Alan Gowen, rock keyboardist (born 1947)
  - W. K. C. Guthrie, classical scholar (born 1906)
  - Sir Manley Laurence Power, Royal Navy admiral (born 1904)
- 18 May
  - Verity Bargate, novelist (born 1940)
  - Reginald Capell, 9th Earl of Essex, peer (born 1906)
  - Sir Graham Savage, civil servant (born 1886)
- 19 May – Collingwood Ingram, ornithologist and gardener (born 1880)
- 23 May
  - Rayner Heppenstall, writer and radio producer (born 1911)
  - Donald Macintyre, Royal Navy captain and historian (born 1904)
- 24 May – Jack Warner, actor (born 1895)
- 27 May
  - Kit Pedler, medical scientist and author (born 1927)
  - Anne Pennington, philologist (born 1934)
- 28 May
  - Manuel Kissen, Lord Kissen, lawyer (born 1912)
  - Charles Lamb, Royal Navy commander (born 1914)
  - Sir Matthew Stevenson, civil servant (born 1910)
  - John Bryan Ward-Perkins, archaeologist (born 1912)
- 29 May – John Dykes Bower, organist (born 1905)
- 31 May – Barbara Ward, Baroness Jackson of Lodsworth, economist and writer (born 1914)

=== June ===
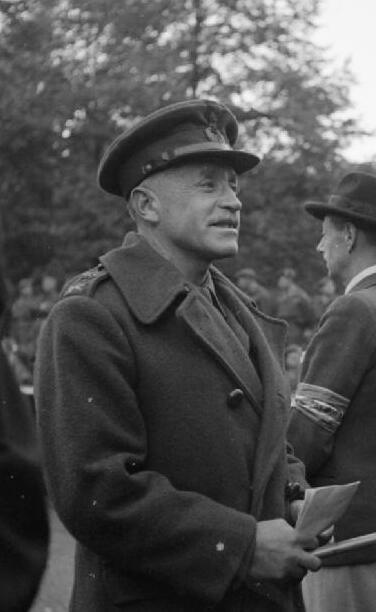
Richard O'Connor

- 1 June – Robert Appleby Bartram, Army colonel (born 1894)
- 3 June – Audrey Smith, cryobiologist (born 1915)
- 8 June – Lydia Lopokova, ballet dancer and widow of John Maynard Keynes (born 1891, Russian Empire)
- 10 June
  - John Boyd, Army brigadier and bacteriologist (born 1891)
  - Sir Trevor Evans, Welsh journalist (born 1902)
- 13 June – Joan Benham, actress (born 1918)
- 14 June – Sir Ronald Holmes, colonial administrator (born 1913)
- 15 June
  - Rhoda Birley, gardener (born 1899, Ireland)
  - Robert Sidney Cahn, chemist (born 1899)
  - Philip Toynbee, author and communist (born 1916)
- 16 June – Hans Coper, potter (born 1920, Germany)
- 17 June
  - Ike Fowler, Welsh rugby player (born 1894)
  - Sir Richard O'Connor, Army general (born 1889)
- 18 June
  - Stan Brogden, rugby player (born 1910)
  - Richard Goolden, actor (born 1895)
  - Pamela Hansford Johnson, novelist, playwright and poet (born 1912)
  - Robert Taylor, politician (born 1932)
- 20 June – Gordon Lang, Welsh preacher and politician (born 1893)
- 22 June – Sir Robert George Howe, diplomat (born 1893)
- 24 June
  - Leslie Bennington, Royal Navy captain (born 1912)
  - Josh Cooper, cryptographer (born 1901)
  - Graeme Haldane, Scottish engineer (born 1897)
- 27 June
  - Paul Brunton, author (born 1898)
  - Gordon Fraser, publisher (born 1911)
  - Charles Jewson, businessman (born 1909)
  - Arthur Wait, football chairman (born 1910)

=== July ===
- 4 July – Herbert Blagrave, English cricketer (born 1899)
- 6 July – Alix Liddell, writer and Guide leader (born 1907)
- 9 July – Leonard Crawley, golfer, cricketer and journalist (born 1903)
- 11 July – John Beeching Frankenburg, lawyer and politician (born 1921)
- 12 July – C. B. Williams, entomologist (born 1889)
- 13 July – Sir Robert Hinde, Army major-general (born 1900)
- 14 July – Sir Hugh Pughe Lloyd, RAF air chief marshal (born 1894)
- 17 July
  - Sam Bartram, English footballer and manager (born 1914)
  - John Gloag, writer on design (born 1896)
- 18 July – Janet Craxton, oboist (born 1929)
- 19 July
  - David Belchem, Army major-general (born 1911)
  - Louis Cheslock, British-born American violinist and composer (born 1898)
- 20 July – Sir Henry William Barnard, judge (born 1891)
- 21 July – Sir John Eaton, Royal Navy vice-admiral (born 1902)
- 23 July – Goronwy Roberts, Baron Goronwy-Roberts, politician (born 1913)
- 25 July – Alice Head, journalist and businesswoman (born 1886)
- 26 July
  - Hope Rotherham, croquet player (born 1894)
  - John Widgery, Baron Widgery, judge (born 1911)
- 28 July – Jack L. Bracelin, Wiccan priest (born 1926)
- 29 July – Sydney Kyte, bandleader (born 1896)

=== August ===
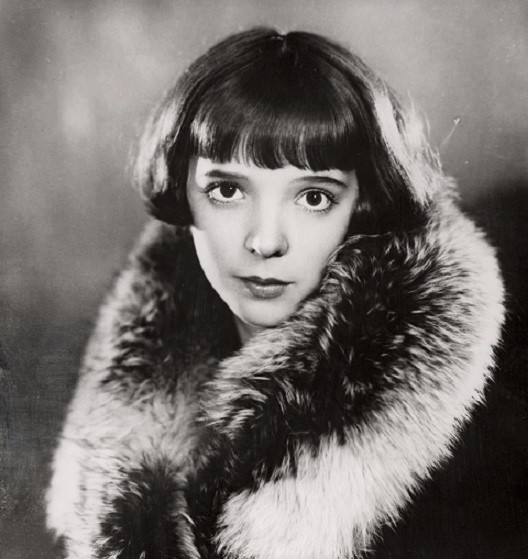
Jessie Matthews

- 2 August – Mary Alexander Cook, museum curator (born 1902)
- 5 August
  - Molly Holden, poet (born 1927)
  - Sir Bernard Keen, soil scientist (born 1890)
  - Reginald Kell, clarinettist (born 1906)
- 9 August – Ralph Bankes, landowner, last private owner of Corfe Castle and Kingston Lacy (born 1902)
- 10 August
  - Sir Alan Lascelles, courtier and civil servant (born 1887)
  - James Parkes, Anglican clergyman, historian and social activist (born 1896)
- 11 August – Sir George Dick-Lauder, 12th Baronet, author and soldier (born 1917)
- 12 August
  - Howard Bone, Royal Navy captain (born 1908)
  - John Hely-Hutchinson, 7th Earl of Donoughmore, peer (born 1902)
- 14 August – Bob Lilley, World War II soldier (born 1914)
- 15 August – Sir Humphrey Waldock, lawyer (born 1904)
- 16 August – Denys Coop, cinematographer (born 1920)
- 18 August – Athol Forbes, World War II air ace (born 1912)
- 19 August – Jessie Matthews, actress, singer and dancer (born 1907)
- 20 August – Sir Charles Woolley, colonial administrator (born 1893)
- 21 August – J. R. L. Anderson, journalist (born 1911)
- 22 August – Mairi Chisholm, World War I nurse (born 1896)
- 24 August – Margery Blackie, physician (born 1898)
- 25 August – Aileen Despard, actress (born 1906)
- 26 August
  - Cresswell Clementi, RAF air vice-marshal (born 1918)
  - Peter Eckersley, television producer (born 1936)
- 28 August – Guy Stevens, record producer and band manager (drug overdose) (born 1943)
- 29 August
  - Joyce Gardner, billiards player (born 1910)
  - James Ralston Kennedy Paterson, radiologist (born 1897)
- 30 August
  - Gerald Bridgeman, 6th Earl of Bradford, peer (born 1911)
  - T. B. W. Reid, philologist (born 1901)
  - Rita Webb, actress (born 1904)
- 31 August – Dave Potter, motorcycle racer (accident while racing) (born 1950)

=== September ===
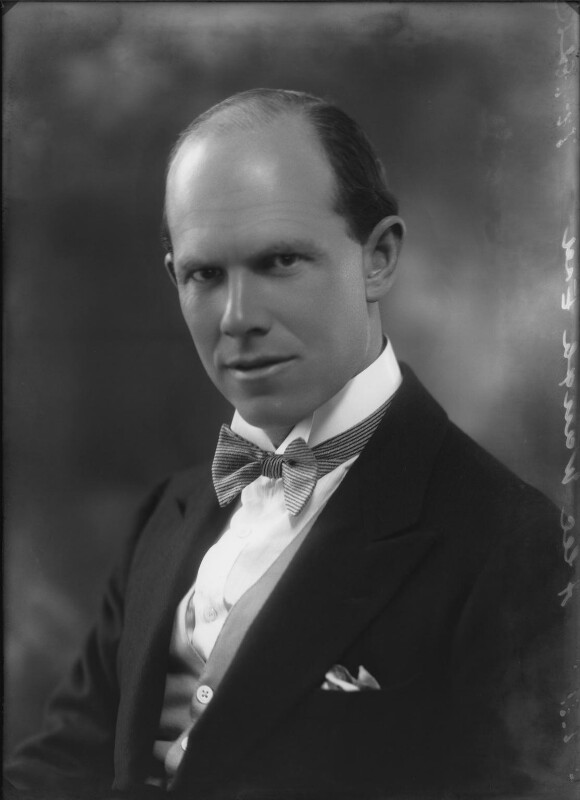
Alec Waugh

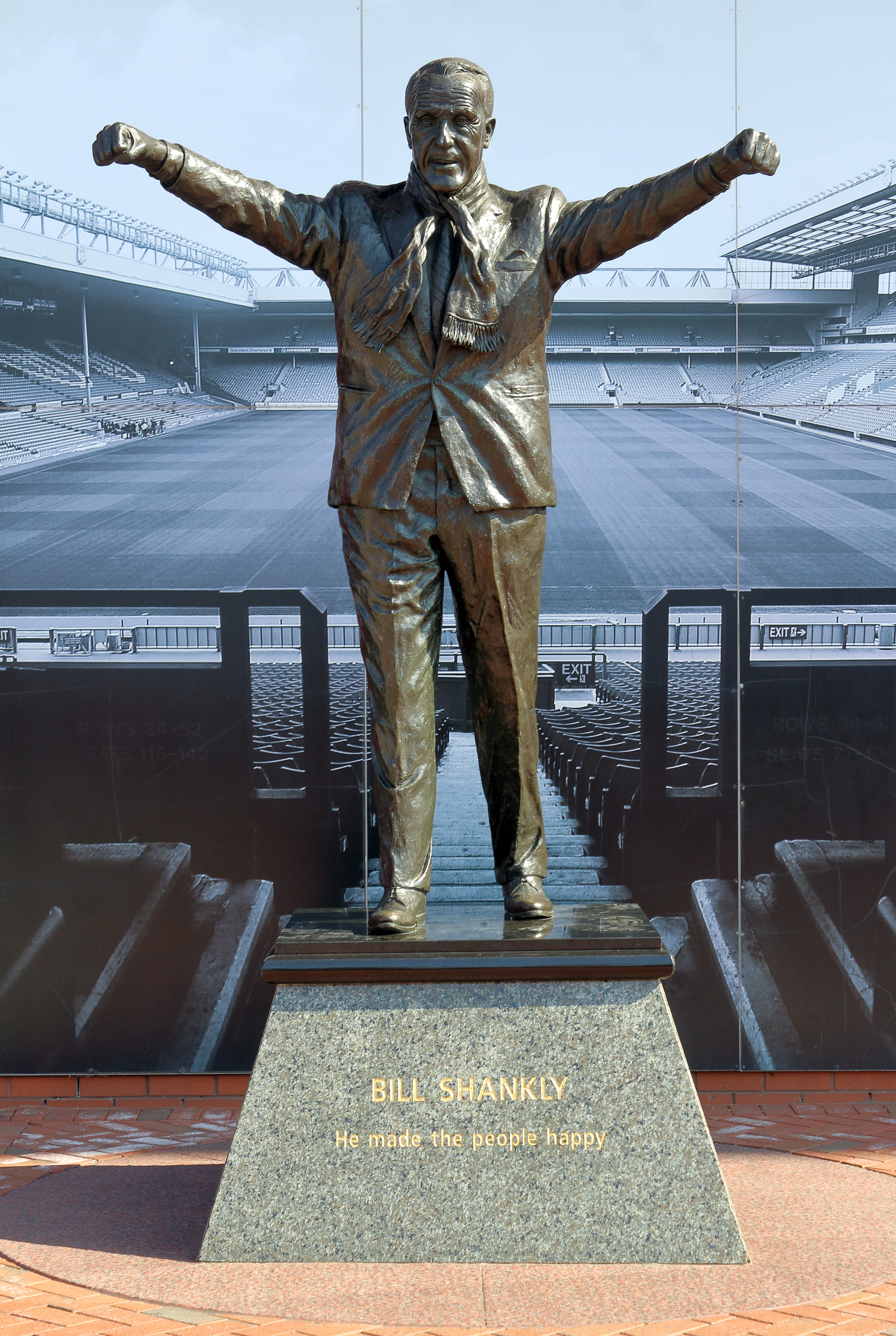
Bill Shankly

- 3 September – Alec Waugh, novelist and brother of Evelyn Waugh (born 1898)
- 4 September
  - Kenneth Cooper, Army major-general (born 1905)
  - David Peel, actor (born 1920)
- 5 September
  - Emery Reves, writer, publisher and literary agent (born 1904, Austria-Hungary)
  - Donald Sinclair, hotel owner (born 1909)
  - Peter J. Young, astrophysicist (born 1954; suicide)
- 6 September – David Crawford, diplomat (born 1928)
- 7 September – Kathleen Guthrie, artist (born 1905)
- 8 September – Bill Shankly, Scottish-born football manager (born 1913)
- 9 September – Sir Gilmour Jenkins, civil servant (born 1894)
- 11 September
  - Harold Bennett, actor (born 1898)
  - Molly, Lady Huggins, activist and philanthropist (born 1907)
  - Sir Rob Lockhart, Army general (born 1893)
  - Henry Spence, politician (born 1897)
- 14 September – Mary Potter, painter (born 1900)
- 17 September – Edward Barrington de Fonblanque, Army major-general and aide-de-camp to King George VI (born 1895)
- 18 September – Brinley Richards, Welsh poet and author (born 1904)
- 19 September – Ruth Tongue, storyteller and writer (born 1898)
- 20 September – Hugh Blandford, chess player (born 1917)
- 21 September
  - George Nelson, 8th Earl Nelson, peer and businessman (born 1905)
  - Nigel Patrick, actor (born 1912)
- 22 September – C. W. Hume, animal welfare worker and writer (born 1886)
- 23 September – Sam Costa, crooner, radio actor and disc jockey (born 1910)
- 24 September – John Ruddock, actor (born 1897)
- 27 September – Sir Stanley Davidson, physician (born 1894)
- 28 September – Edward Boyle, Baron Boyle of Handsworth, politician (born 1923)
- 29 September
  - Ron Maudsley, legal scholar (born 1918)
  - Tommy Moore, rock drummer (born 1931)
  - Frances Yates, historian (born 1899)
- 30 September
  - Roy John, Welsh rugby union player (born 1925)
  - Boyd Neel, orchestral conductor (born 1905)
  - Sir John Rennie, intelligence officer (born 1914)

=== October ===
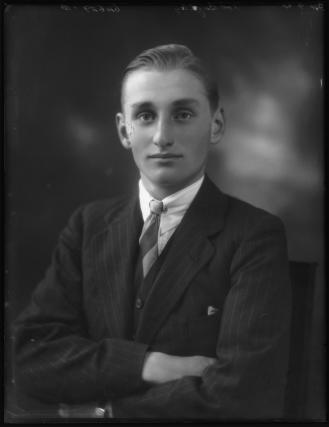
David Cecil, 6th Marquess of Exeter

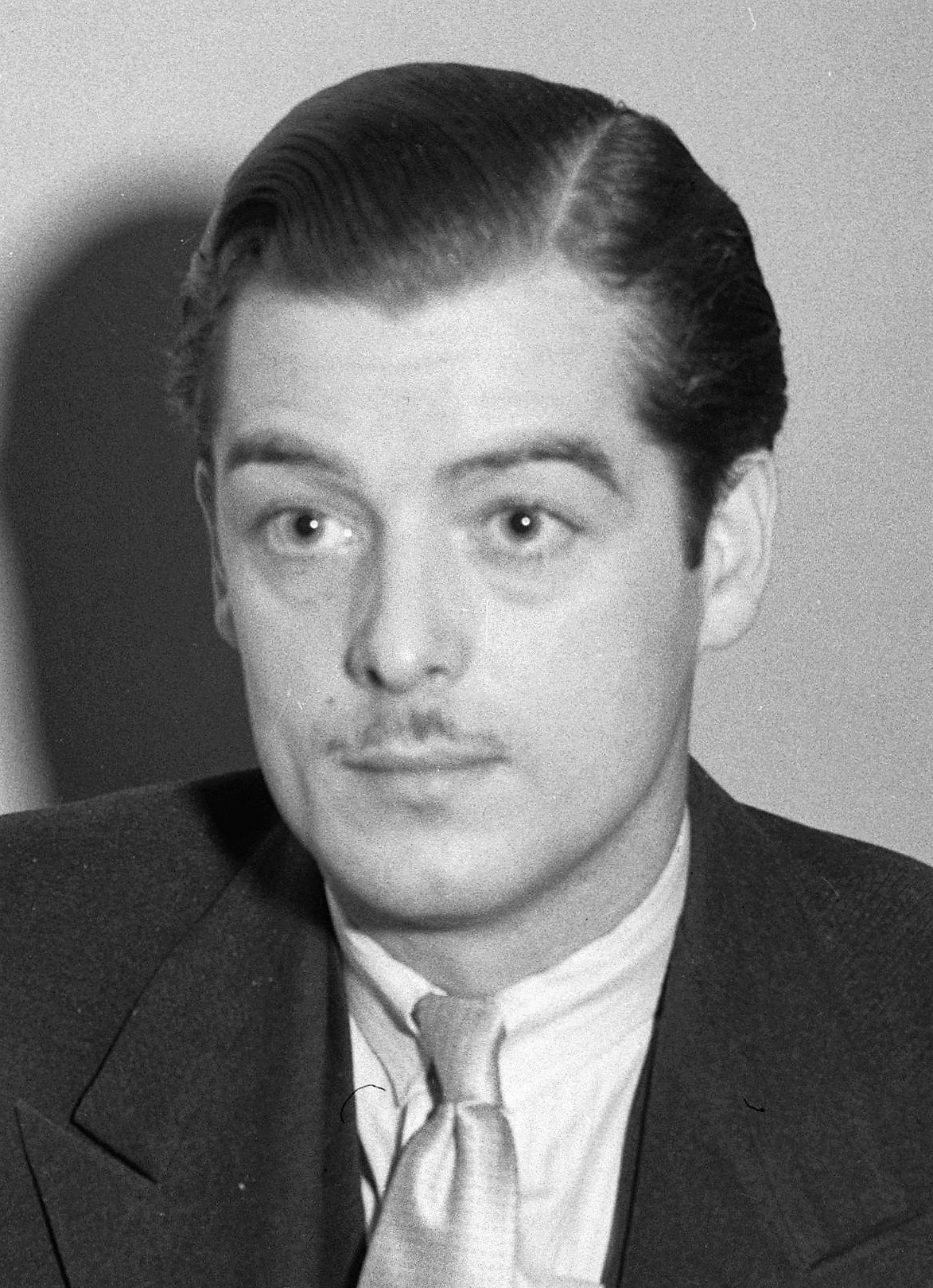
John Warburton

- 1 October
  - John Collier Frederick Hopkins, mycologist (born 1898)
  - Sir Graham Page, lawyer and politician (born 1911)
- 6 October – Sir Eric Eastwood, radar engineer (born 1910)
- 7 October – Dennis Leston, entomologist (born 1917)
- 8 October – Arthur Allen, politician (born 1887)
- 12 October
  - Robert McKenzie, political analyst (born 1917)
  - Enzo Plazzotta, sculptor (born 1921, Italy)
- 13 October – Samuel Hood, 6th Viscount Hood, peer and diplomat (born 1910)
- 15 October – Philip Fotheringham-Parker, racing driver (born 1907)
- 19 October – Johnny Doyle, Scottish footballer (accident) (born 1951)
- 20 October
  - Sir Alec Coryton, RAF air chief marshal (born 1895)
  - Catherwood Learmonth, legal administrator (born 1896)
  - James S. Meadows, politician (born 1911)
- 21 October – David Llewellyn, Welsh miner and trade unionist (born 1907)
- 22 October – David Cecil, 6th Marquess of Exeter, peer and Olympic athlete (born 1905)
- 23 October – Reg Butler, sculptor (born 1913)
- 24 October – Inger K. Frith, archer (born 1909, Denmark)
- 25 October
  - Cynthia Harnett, children's author (born 1893)
  - Eric Woodburn, actor (born 1894)
- 26 October – Kenneth Howorth, Metropolitan Police officer (murdered by the Provisional IRA) (born 1932)
- 27 October
  - Herbert Cecil Benyon Berens, accountant (born 1908)
  - Sir Randle Feilden, Army major-general (born 1904)
  - Richard Llewelyn-Davies, Baron Llewelyn-Davies, architect (born 1912)
  - John Warburton, actor (born 1903)
- 30 October
  - Terry Bishop, screenwriter and film director (born 1912)
  - Maurice Fogel, mentalist (born 1911)
  - Denys Rhodes, writer (born 1919)
- 31 October – Charles Murison, Army major-general (born 1894, Canada)

=== November ===
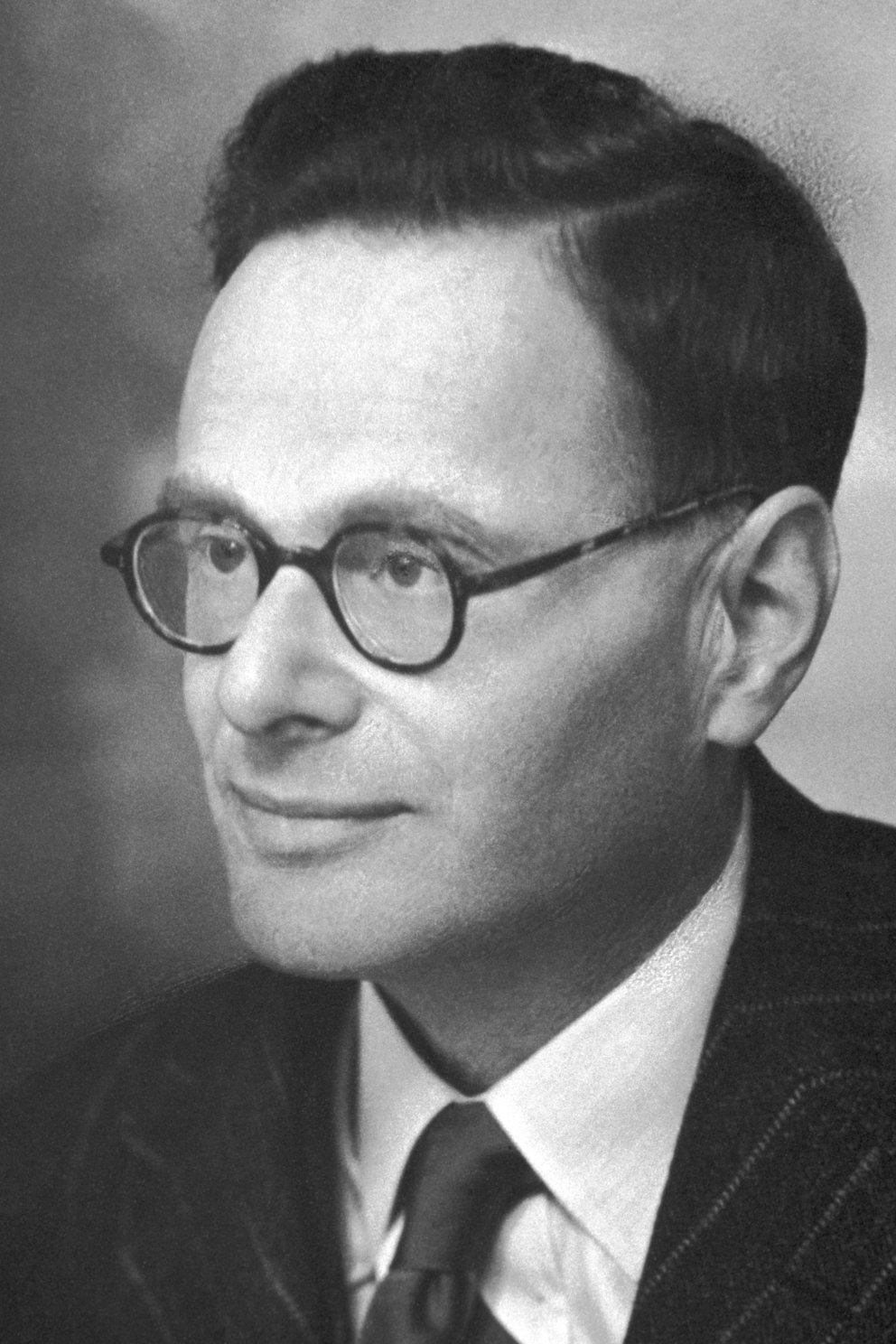
Hans Adolf Krebs

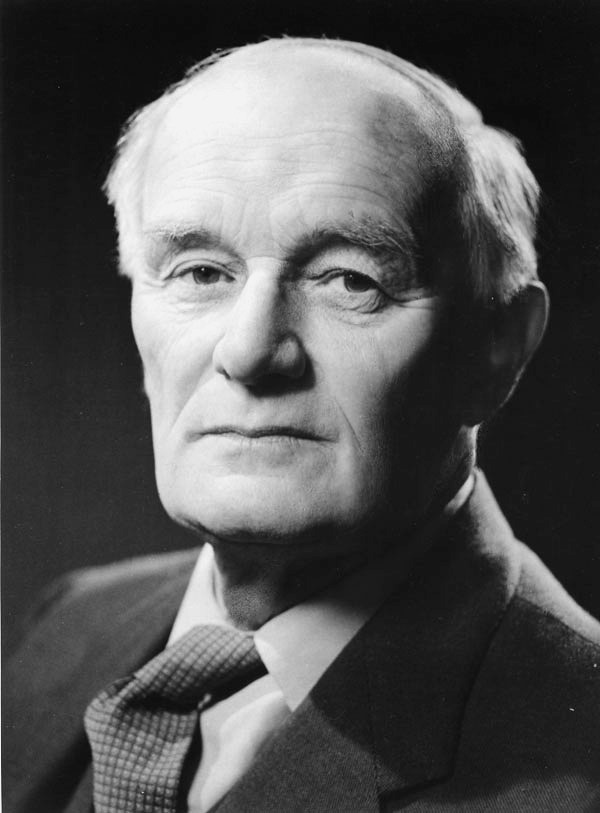
T. H. Marshall

- 1 November
  - Cyril Carr, politician (born 1926)
  - Richard Howard, Anglican priest and author (born 1884)
  - Patrick Dunbar Ritchie, chemist and artist (born 1907)
- 2 November – Kenneth Oakley, physical anthropologist (born 1911)
- 5 November
  - Helen Blackler, phycologist and botanical collector (born 1902)
  - Sir Harold Vincent, English cricketer (born 1891)
- 6 November
  - Digby George Gerahty, novelist (born 1898)
  - Douglas Vernon Hubble, physician (born 1900)
  - Beryl Hutchinson, World War I nurse (born 1892)
- 7 November
  - Arthur Lovegrove, actor and playwright (born 1913)
  - Robert Maxwell Ogilvie, classical scholar (born 1932)
  - Sidney Robertson-Rodger, war artist (born 1916)
- 8 November
  - Tim Brookshaw, jockey (born 1929)
  - Lionel Heald, lawyer and politician (born 1897)
- 9 November – Willis Grant, organist (born 1907)
- 12 November – Sir Gilbert Rennie, colonial administrator (born 1895)
- 14 November – Robert Bradford, Northern Irish politician (murdered by the Provisional IRA) (born 1941)
- 17 November – Colin Winter, Anglican bishop (born 1928)
- 22 November – Sir Hans Adolf Krebs, physician, biochemist and Nobel laureate (born 1900, German Empire)
- 23 November – Sir Olaf Caroe, colonial administrator (born 1892)
- 24 November – Archibald Thomas John Dollar, geologist and seismologist (born 1908)
- 26 November – Vincent Bladen, British-Canadian economist (born 1900)
- 27 November – Richard S. Lambert, biographer and broadcaster (born 1894)
- 29 November
  - Isabella Carrie, suffragette and teacher (born 1878)
  - T. H. Marshall, sociologist (born 1893)
  - William Vale, World War II air ace (born 1914)
- 30 November
  - Val Gielgud, actor, director and broadcaster, brother of John Gielgud (born 1900)
  - Charles Eric Maine, science fiction writer (born 1921)
  - Sir Philip Southwell, industrialist (born 1894)

=== December ===
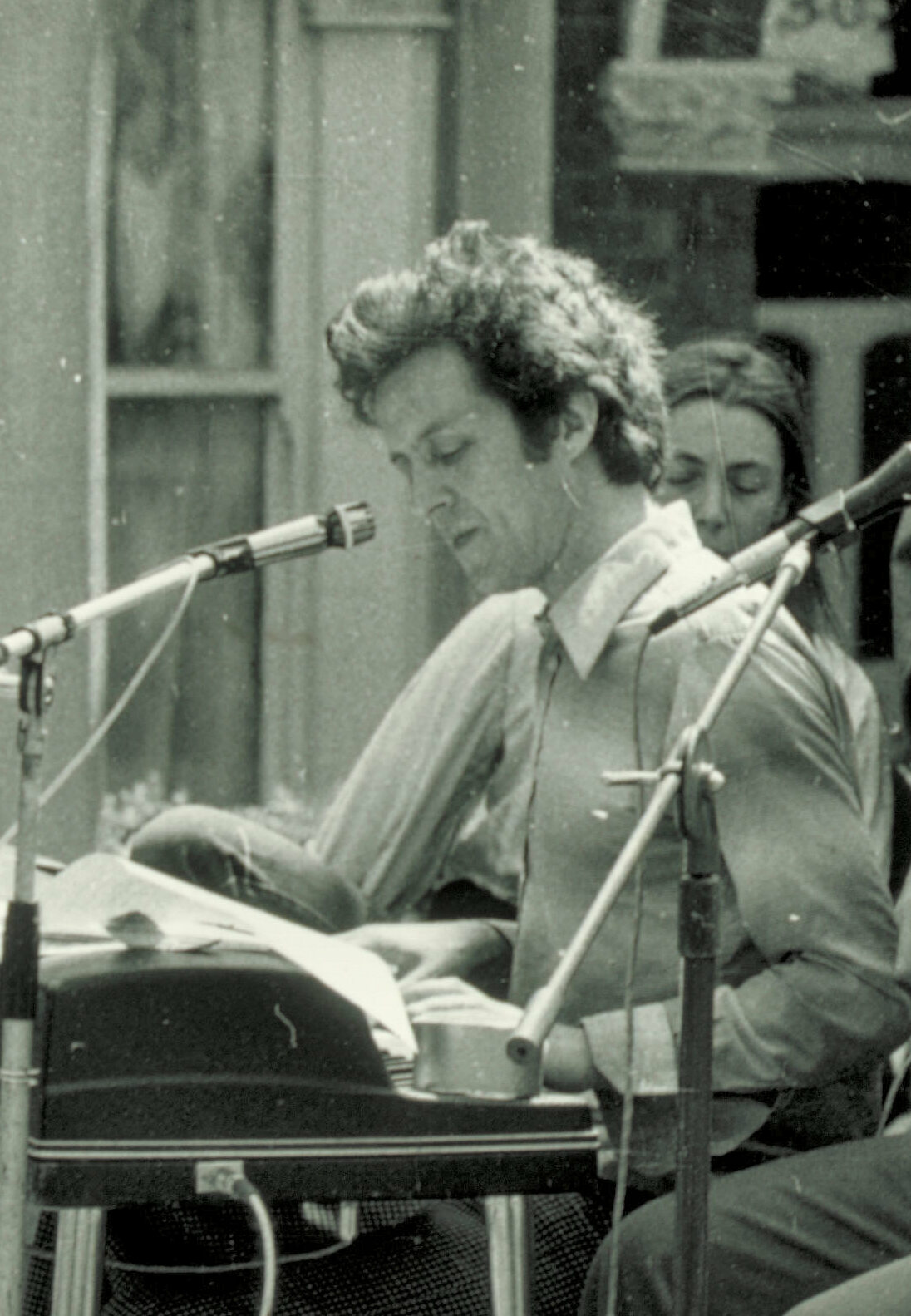
Cornelius Cardew

- 1 December – Sir James Monteith Grant, Scottish herald, Lord Lyon King of Arms (born 1903)
- 2 December – Leslie Baker, film executive (born 1903)
- 3 December – Charles Harvard Gibbs-Smith, historian (born 1909)
- 4 December
  - Enid Welsford, writer (born 1892)
  - Sir Robert Wright, surgeon (born 1915)
- 7 December – Gordon Rattray Taylor, author and journalist (born 1911)
- 8 December – Bob Lord, chairman of Burnley Football Club (born 1908)
- 9 December
  - Brian McTigue, rugby player (born 1930)
  - C. P. Taylor, playwright (born 1929)
- 10 December – John D. Eshelby, metallurgist (born 1916)
- 12 December – Sir Thomas Hobart Ellis, colonial administrator (born 1894)
- 13 December – Cornelius Cardew, composer and musician (car accident) (born 1936)
- 14 December – Cyril Ayden Fisk, Methodist chaplain (born 1909)
- 15 December – Claud Cockburn, journalist (born 1904)
- 16 December
  - Frank McLardy, Nazi collaborator (born 1915)
  - Rose Winslade, engineering manager (born 1919)
- 17 December
  - Sybil Gordon, opera singer (born 1902)
  - Colin William MacLeod, classical scholar (born 1943; suicide)
  - George Moon, actor (born 1909)
- 18 December
  - Anthony Chaplin, 3rd Viscount Chaplin, peer (born 1906)
  - Philip Lucas, aviator (born 1902)
  - George Wilks, motorcycle racer (born 1908)
- 23 December – Paul Chambers, industrialist (born 1904)
- 26 December – Amber Reeves, feminist writer and scholar (born 1887, New Zealand)
- 27 December
  - Sir Charles Evans, Royal Navy vice-admiral (born 1908)
  - Reginald Harding, Army major-general (born 1905)

== See also ==
- 1981 in British music
- 1981 in British television
- List of British films of 1981
