= John Lambie =

John Lambie may refer to:

- John Lambie (engineer)
- John Lambie (footballer, born 1868), Scottish international football player
- John Lambie (footballer, born 1941), Scottish football player (Falkirk, St Johnstone) and manager (Partick Thistle)
- John Lambie (rugby union) (born 1951), Australian rugby union player

== See also ==
- John Lambe, astrologer
- John Lambe (M5 rapist)
