= Anthony Hollis =

Sir Anthony Hollis

Justice of the High Court
- In office 1982–1997

Personal details
- Born: Anthony Barnard Hollis

Sir Anthony Barnard Hollis (11 May 1927 – 24 November 2003) was a British barrister and judge. He was a Justice of the High Court, sitting in the Family Division, from 1982 to 1997. During his time on the bench, he sat on a number of high-profile cases involving allegations of mass child abuse.

== Biography ==
Hollis was educated at Tonbridge School and, after National Service, went up to St Peter's Hall, Oxford (now St Peter's College, Oxford). He was called to the bar by Gray's Inn in 1951 and joined 13 King's Bench Walk, which had been founded by Bernard Hollis, his grandfather, eventually becoming head of chambers. He took silk in 1979.

His uncle, Sir Henry Barnard, was a High Court judge.
