= Isabella Carrie =

Scottish suffragette (1878–1981)

- Born: 3 May 1878; Arbroath, Angus, Scotland
- Died: November 29, 1981 (aged 103); Broughty Ferry, Dundee, Scotland
- Education: Church of Scotland Training College
- Occupation: Schoolteacher
- Known for: Secret suffragette

Isabella Scrimgeour Carrie (3 May 1878 – 29 November 1981) was a Scottish suffragette and schoolteacher. She became a suffragette after bouncers threw her out of a meeting where Winston Churchill was speaking. She was said to have remarked, "I did not come to the meeting as a suffragette, but I am now".

== Life ==
Carrie was born in Arbroath in 1878 to Richard and Ann Carrie. She attended school locally and at the age of fourteen she became a pupil-teacher. This meant that she got some training as she taught at a school for four years. She moved to Edinburgh where she attended the Church of Scotland Training College. She then taught in Fife and Arbroath but her health declined. She was teaching in Dundee in 1908 when the suffragettes were beginning to make headlines.

She came to be associated with the Women's Social and Political Union in an unusual way. She had gone to hear Winston Churchill speak and he was a well known opposer of women having the vote. Carrie got up to ask a question on this subject and she was thrown out of the hall. The bouncers had assumed she was one of the suffragettes who were heckling Churchill's meetings. The mistake of the bouncers was mirrored by WSPU members who also assumed that her question to Churchill was part of a campaign. The WSPU were a militant organisation involved in increasing criminal protests to draw attention to their cause. They asked Carrie to join them but she did not feel it was possible, although she was said to have remarked 'I did not come to the meeting as a suffragette, but I am now'. However she remained a secret supporter, as she was a primary school teacher but in 1912 she began the risky task of looking after WSPU members who were travelling in the area, and she maintained a small library for the organisation. Her respectable middle class profile meant that her house in Baldovan Terrace, Dundee, which she had moved to when her father died, was not an obvious suspect for housing what the authorities considered criminals.

Carrie was asked to keep her visitors' identities secret and she kept her word. Even after the first and the second world war she would not reveal who led the WSPU in Dundee, and she often left her house open and food available but did not actually meet the WSPU visitors herself. It is known that she once expected to house Emmeline Pankhurst in 1914 but Pankhurst was arrested in Glasgow before she got to Carrie's house, but she said in some way she was relieved due to the risk of the police raiding her property as Pankhurst was most wanted, though she would have liked to meet her.

Carrie did not have good health and in 1938 she retired and decided to spend her money on a trip around the world as she felt that death was near. Carrie got as far as New York before war broke out. She did not fully reveal her suffragette past until 1976, as she was concerned that she may still be at risk of imprisonment.

Carrie was to live until she was over 100 years old. She died in a nursing home on 29 November 1981 in Broughty Ferry.
