= Sidney Robertson-Rodger =

English painter

Sidney Bertram Robertson-Rodger (15 July 1916 – 7 November 1981) was an English painter notable as a War Artist, principally for his painting Bombers Escorted by Fighters on a Daylight Sweep over the Channel depicting the Battle of Britain. He was also known as S Rodger, SR Rodger or S Robertson-Rodger.

== Childhood and education ==
He was born in Burgh Heath in the North Downs in Surrey, the son of James Nisbet Robertson RODGER a painter and antiques dealer, and his wife Margaret (Meg) Plumer KESWICK.

After completing final examinations at Malvern College (a senior school with sixth form) in the Malvern Hills he attended the private Byam Shaw School of Art (1934–1938) where he studied with Frances Ernest Jackson ARA (1872–1945) and Patrick Philips RI, ROI (1907–1976).

== Military service ==
On the 1939 Register Sidney Robertson-Rodger is described as a "Camouflage Officer" living in Flat 17 Bolton Studios, Kensington, London. He received military training at the Royal Military Academy Sandhurst in 1940.

He painted as part of the large War Artists' Advisory Committee (WAAC) during World War II. The WAAC bought his work. His key work, Bombers Escorted by Fighters on a Daylight Sweep over the Channel, is owned by the Ministry of Defence.

== Family ==
Sidney Bertram Robertson-Rodger married Dora June Rossdale. They were married in the June Q of 1970 at St. Marylebone. Dora June (known as June) was the daughter of Dr. George Harold Rossdale M.D. Medical Officer of the Tropical Diseases Clinic of the Ministry of Pensions & Kate Alberta Woolf.

== Career ==
According to his biography by Goldmark Gallery, he exhibited at two major painting societies in the Federation of British Artists (FBA): the Royal Institute of Painters in Water Colours (RI), and Royal Institute of Oil Painters (ROI).

The gallery found little is known of what became of the artist's reputation and professional status after the war. It found that he kept on painting and exhibiting into the 1960s and beyond. Primarily a landscape painter, he wrote a significant article entitled "Painting the Open Landscape" during the 1960s.

== Works ==
In his works he was also known as S Rodger, SR Rodger or S Robertson-Rodger.

- Bombers Escorted by Fighters on a Daylight Sweep over the Channel
- Man with donkey passing a house (possibly painted in Spain or Ireland)Oil on Canvas
- Squadron DAF Libya (1940–45) Sketch/watercolour
- North Africa campaign WW2 (1940–45) - Featuring Hurricane fighter planes over the merditerranean Sketch/watercolour
- Wimbledon Centre Court
- Pair of nautical watercolours (1949)
- Ramsgate (1975)
- Cottage in ruins on headland
- Seascape with lifeboat and crashed aircraft, oil on canvas, signed, 50 cm x 75 cm.
- Kenton
