= Irene Baird =

English-Canadian novelist (1901–1981)

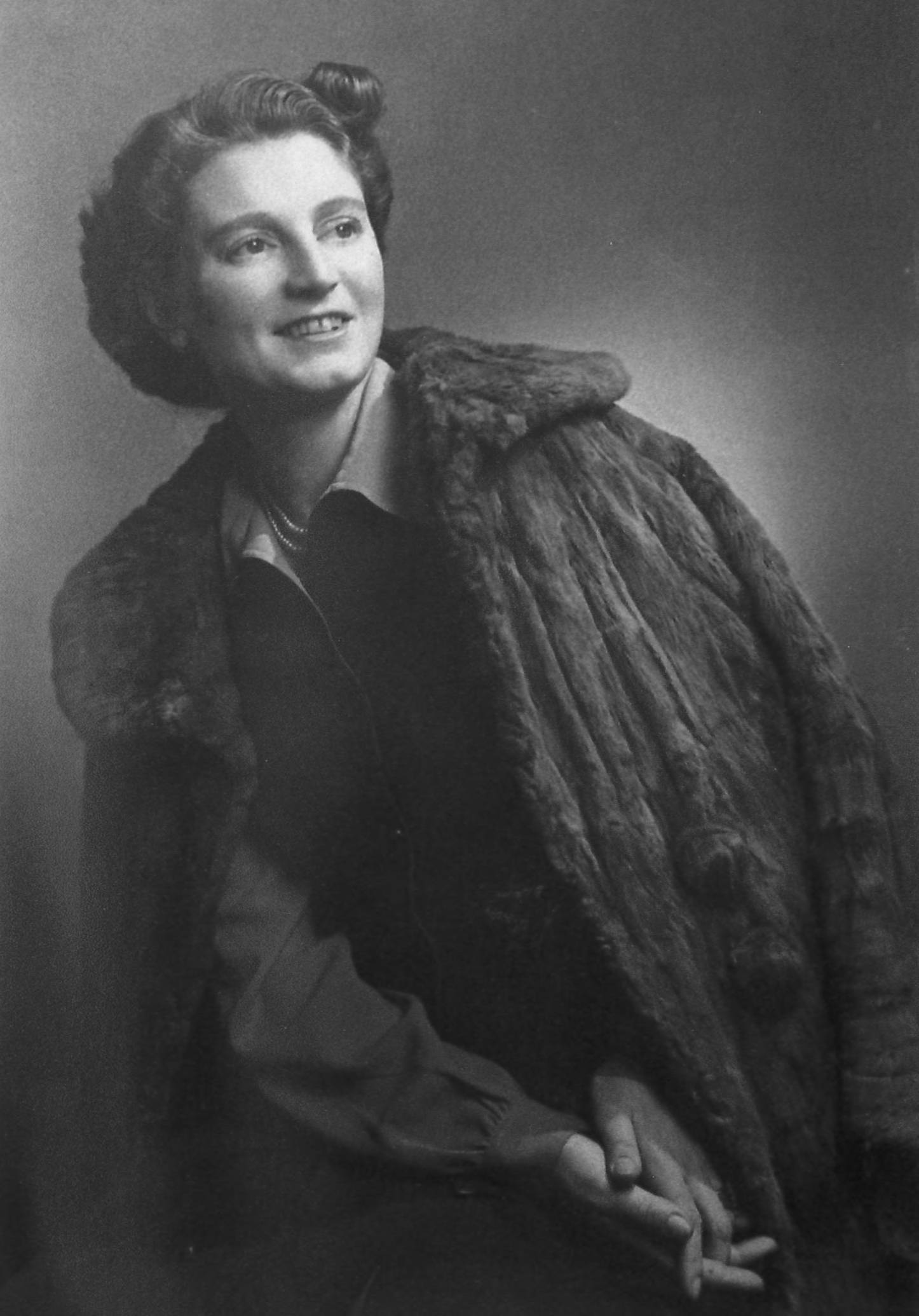
- Irene Baird in 1942. Portrait by Yousuf Karsh.
- Born: Irene Violet Elise Todd; April 9, 1901; Carlisle, Cumberland, England
- Died: April 17, 1981 (aged 80); Coquitlam, British Columbia, Canada
- Occupations: Novelist, journalist, civil servant
- Writing career
- Period: 20th century
- Genres: Novels, journalism, non-fiction

Irene Baird (April 4, 1901, Carlisle – April 19, 1981, Coquitlam) was an English-Canadian novelist, journalist and civil servant. She is best known for her 1939 novel Waste Heritage, a depiction of labour strife. She wrote four novels and also contributed journalism, stories, and poetry. In the early 1940s she began work for National Film Board and then the government of Canada, eventually becoming the first woman to head a federal information division.

== Early life and first novel ==
Baird was born Irene Violet Elise Todd, on April 9, 1901, in Carlisle, England. She was the only daughter of Robert and Eva Todd, owners of a woollen mill. Her education was through a governess and ensuing boarding schools. After her father took a fly fishing trip to British Columbia, in 1919 the family relocated to Qualicum Beach, on Vancouver Island. In 1923, she married Robert Baird, an engineer, and they settled in Vancouver. They had two children, Robert (b. 1924) and June (b. 1928). In the early 1930s, Baird was the first female teacher at St. George's Boys' Anglican Private School in Vancouver.

Baird moved to Victoria in 1937. In the same year, she published her first novel, John, an elegiac character study. The central figure is John Dorey, a 62 year-old English war veteran who rejects the family wool trade. He settles on a coastal farm in Lisk, a fictional setting evidently somewhere on Vancouver Island. The book was a best-seller and frequently compared to James Hilton's novella, Goodbye, Mr. Chips.

== Waste Heritage ==
In 1939, Baird published Waste Heritage, her second novel. It follows the aftermath of a real event in June 1938, a day known as Bloody Sunday, when police forcibly expelled unemployed men who had occupied the Vancouver Post Office for nineteen days. After the men were driven off by tear gas and clubs, some two thousand unemployed men travelled to Victoria to challenge the government. The protagonist of the novel is Matt Striker, twenty-two years old and a man of no fixed residence, who arrives just after the conclusion of the sit-down occupation. He befriends Eddy who has diminished mental faculties from being beaten by police. Matt, who suffers at times from "rage blindness," wants to take a greater role in the labour movement but is rejected due to his unpredictability. Toward the novel's end, Eddy's search for a pair of shoes leads to an altercation with a police officer. Matt intervenes and loses control, beating the policeman to death. In a remorseful panic, Eddy sacrifices himself in front of an oncoming train.

The novel had a positive reception upon release. In 1939, Bruce Hutchison called it "one of the best books to come out of Canada in our time." A frequent comparison was made between Waste Heritage's characters Matt and his simple friend Eddy, with George and Lennie of John Steinbeck's Of Mice and Men. When viewed critically, the similarity is superficial. Contemporary reviews also likened the novel to Steinbeck's The Grapes of Wrath, but Waste Heritage had already been sent to its Canadian publisher, Macmillan, when Steinbeck's book appeared. The Canadian and American editions of the book differ in that some of the lines of the Canadian edition were subjected to censorship under the aegis of the War Measures Act. The novel had disappointing sales and the book went out of print in 1942. It was not to be reissued until 1973, when again it soon became unavailable for thirty years. In 2007, the University of Ottawa Press published a new edition.

While Baird was politically a moderate, her novel is an effective rendering of labour unrest. No longer neglected, Waste Heritage is now considered an important work of literature. It has been called the best naturalistic Canadian novel to appear from the 1930s, as well as one of the most vital social documents of the period.

== War years ==
In 1940 and 1941, Baird gave radio addresses on the war that were published as a pamphlet, The North American Tradition. In it she extolled Canadians to have the courage of the pioneers and for Canada to act as a link between England and the United States.

Baird published her third novel, He Rides The Sky, in 1941. It was derived in part from actual wartime letters. The protagonist is Pilot Sergeant Pete O'Halloran, from Victoria, British Columbia, who joins the Royal Air Force in 1938. His letters to friends and family describe his training and subsequent combat missions, until the last letter sent the day before his death in April 1940. The book received good reviews as well as tributes from the air force, but sales were poor and it soon went out of print.

In 1941, Baird began writing a column for the Vancouver Sun newspaper. The following year she joined the staff of the Daily Province. Not long after the National Film Board offered her a position and she moved to Ottawa. Her job entailed film distribution work in the United States, and she worked under supervision of the Canadian ambassador and Lester Pearson, then with the Canadian delegation at the United Nations. By the end of the war, Baird and her husband had effectively separated, although they never legally divorced. In 1945, she became the National Film Board representative and information officer in the Canadian consulate in Mexico City. Baird was fluent in French and quickly learned Spanish.

== Civil Servant ==
Baird lost her film board position in 1947 when she was accused of being a communist by the Minister of National Revenue, James McCann. She was soon rehired as the first information officer in the Department of Mines and Resources. In 1962, she became the first woman to lead an information division in the federal government. Her office, as part of the renamed Department of Northern Affairs and National Resources, encompassed Canada's Arctic. She was a frequent and intrepid traveller to the region. She published lectures, articles, and pamphlets about the Arctic. She regularly gave lectures on radio and television. Her writing regarding the Inuit and the north was often promotional in tone, as required by her position. Baird was supportive of Inuit efforts to preserve their own culture against southern whites. During this period she wrote travel narratives, poetry, and short stories. Her poetry often displayed themes of tragedy and alienation. Baird's literary work appeared in Saturday Night, Beaver, North, Canadian Geographical Journal, and the Unesco Courier. She retired from the civil service in 1967, and after a few months settled in London.

== The Climate of Power and last years ==
In 1971, Baird published her last novel, The Climate of Power. It details the struggles for power in the upper ranks of the Canadian civil service. George McKenna, a career bureaucrat, is resisting his impending retirement. He is also contending with an unhappy marriage to a much younger woman. McKenna has spent considerable time in the north, and considers the Inuit with a decided paternalism. He feels threatened by a younger, more modern bureaucrat, Roy Wragge. Eventually, on a boat trip in the Arctic Ocean, McKenna rocks the boat so that Wragge falls in the water, consigning him to a certain death due to the cold water temperature. On a final trip to the north, McKenna loses his feet to frostbite after stubbornly setting out on a trek in a snowstorm. She showed a deft hand in depicting the tensions and shifting alliances of the civil service. The book is also a revealing window on the colonial encounter, conveying how government policy led to the disintegration of Inuit communities. This worldview felt antiquated by contemporary tastes. Reviews were marginally favourable or negative. The weakly marketed book virtually disappeared without a trace.

Due to failing health, Baird returned to Victoria in 1974. She lived there until her death on April 17, 1981, in Coquitlam, British Columbia.

== Works ==
=== Fiction ===
- John. Philadelphia, Toronto; London: J. B. Lippincott Company; Collins. 1937.
- Waste Heritage. New York; Toronto: Random House; Macmillan. 1939.
- He Rides the Sky. Toronto: The Macmillan Company of Canada Limited. 1941.
- The Climate of Power. Toronto: Macmillan of Canada. 1971.

=== Non-fiction ===
- The North American Tradition. Toronto: The Macmillan Company of Canada Limited. 1941.
- Inuvik: Place of Man. Canada: Department of Northern Affairs and National Resources, Editorial and Information Division. 1960.
- Cape Dorset Man. Ottawa: Royal Canadian Geographical Society. c. 1965.
- The Eskimos in Canada. Toronto: Indian-Eskimo Association of Canada. 1971.
- Canada's North: A Land on the Move. Ottawa: Department of Indian and Northern Development. c. 1971.

=== Periodical contributions ===
- Beaver. Winnipeg
- Canadian Geographical Journal. Ottawa
- Laurentian University Review. Sudbury, Ontario
- North
- Northern Affairs Bulletin
- Ottawa Journal
- Saturday Night. Toronto
- Toronto Star Weekly
- Unesco Courier
- Vancouver Daily Province
- Vancouver Sun

== Sources ==
- Fletcher, A. (2014). "Toxic Discourse: Waste Heritage as Ghetto Pastoral". Studies in Canadian Literature. 39 (2): 5–21.
- Hill, Colin (2007). "Critical Introduction". Waste Heritage. By Baird, Irene. Hill, Colin (ed.). Ottawa: University of Ottawa Press. pp. ix–lvii. ISBN 978-0-7766-0649-1.
- Hopkins, Anthony (1986). "Thematic Structure and Vision in Waste Heritage". Studies in Canadian Literature. 11 (1): 77–85. ISSN 0380-6995.
- Hyman, Roger Leslie (Winter 1982–1983). "Wasted Heritage and Waste Heritage: The Critical Disregrard of an Important Canadian Novel". Journal of Canadian Studies. 17 (4): 47–87. doi:10.3138/jcs.17.4.74. ISSN 0021-9495. S2CID 151861609.
- McLay, Catherine (1988). "Irene Baird". In New, W. H. (ed.). Canadian Writers, 1920–1959: First Series. Vol. 68. Detroit: Gale Research Company. pp. 15–17.
- Mason, Jody (Winter 2006). "State Censorship and Irene Baird's Waste Heritage". Canadian Literature (191): 192–194.
- Mason, Jody (Fall 2007). "Sidown, Brother, Sidown!: the problem of commitment and the publishing history of Irene Baird's Waste Heritage". Papers of the Bibliographical Society of Canada. 45 (2). Bibliographical Society of Canada. doi:10.33137/pbsc.v45i2.18515.
- Mathews, Robin (1981). "Waste Heritage: The Effect of Class on Literary Structure". Studies in Canadian Literature. 6 (1): 65–81. ISSN 0380-6995.
- Sangster, Joan (Autumn 2011). "Creating a Writer's Archive: Irene Baird's Work and Travel, 1940–1967". Journal of Historical Biography. 10: 34–69.
- Sangster, Joan (2012). "Irene Baird's 'North and South' in The Climate of Power". Journal of the Canadian Historical Association. 23 (1). Canadian Historical Association: 283–318. doi:10.7202/1015735ar.
