= Cyril Ayden Fisk =

British priest

The Reverend Cyril Ayden Fisk
- Born: 4 June 1909; Mundesley, Norfolk, England
- Died: 14 December 1981 (aged 72); Swindon, Wiltshire, England
- Education: Hartley Victoria College
- Spouse: Irene Havill Dyer
- Relatives: Sir Alfred Dyer (father-in-law)
- Military career
- Allegiance: United Kingdom
- Branch: Royal Air Force
- Service years: 1939–1964

Cyril Ayden Fisk (4 June 1909 – 14 December 1981) was a Methodist priest and Royal Air Force chaplain.

== Career ==
Fisk entered the Victoria University of Manchester in 1929. He received his B.A. in 1932 and his B.D. in 1938. In 1934, he went to Teesport to take a service, which he subsequently wrote was "the most awful show in creation." After a year on the President's list, he served in the Watton, Rockland, and Ipswich circuits before being commissioned into the Royal Air Force as a chaplain in 1939.

After three year services in Iraq and the Middle East, Fisk returned to the United Kingdom in 1944. He served successively as Assistant Principal Chaplain to the Far East Air Force, Transport Command, Coastal Command and the Royal Air Force Germany. Building of the Garrison Church of St. Andrew's, Rheindahlen, was made possible largely due to his "personal influence" and "deep commitment". On returning from Germany, he became Director of Studies at the new Royal Air Force Chaplains Branch at Amport House, Andover. In 1953, he was promoted to the rank of Wing commander.

Fisk returned to circuit work in 1964, serving two years in the Kent Mission before he contracted Parkinson's disease and was forced into early retirement to Stanton Fitzwarren in the Swindon Circuit. He served for a time as an honorary secretary of the Royal Navy, Army and Air Force Board of the Methodist Church, and as health allowed, served six years on the Highworth Rural District Council, where he gained a reputation for sterling service. With health worsening, he moved to Swindon where, on 14 December 1981, he died.

== Personality ==
According to Geoff Dickinson, "Fisk had a markedly individual personality which would not fit easily into any preconceived expectations of the role of minister and chaplain. A man of gifted mind and great discernment, his character was one of gentle strength with a dry sense of humour."

== Personal life ==
Fisk married Irene Havill Dyer, daughter of Sir Alfred Dyer, on 20 May 1940 at Hinde Street Methodist Church in Marylebone, London.
