= Gladys Vasey =

British artist

- Born: Gladys Johnstone; 8 June 1889; Blackpool, England
- Died: 22 January 1981 (aged 91); Aberystwyth, Wales
- Known for: Portrait painting

Gladys Vasey née Johnstone (8 June 1889 – 22 January 1981) was a British artist known for her portrait painting and landscapes.

== Biography ==
Vasey was born in Blackpool and was brought up in Manchester and, after attending a finishing school in Germany, took private art classes in Manchester with the artist William Fitz during 1909. In 1911 she married Roland Vasey, an insurance surveyor, and for a time lived in Birkenhead and then Cheshire. In 1936 she moved to Newlyn in Cornwall to attend the Stanhope Forbes School of Painting and also took classes with Lamorna Birch. From the beginning of World War II, Vasey mostly lived in Wales and won first prize for a painting at the Royal National Eisteddfod of Wales in 1946. She was a member of the Manchester Academy of Fine Arts and regularly exhibited works there from the 1930s thru to the 1960s. She was also a member of the Society of Women Artists and the Royal Cambrian Academy and regularly exhibited with the Royal Society of Portrait Painters in the 1950s and, throughout her career, at the annual exhibition of modern art held at the Atkinson Art Gallery in Southport. From 1957 onwards she wrote regularly for the Art Quarterly magazine. A solo exhibition of her work, Portraits and other paintings was held at the National Library of Wales in Aberystwyth. The same body organised a touring retrospective exhibition of her work in 1991 and both the National Library and Manchester Art Gallery hold examples of her work.
