= William John McCallien =

Scottish mathematician and geologist

William John McCallien FRSE FGS OBE (1902-1981) was a 20th-century Scottish geologist and artist. He is known generally as William J. McCallien as an author, a common misconception is that he was also the artist known as W. J. McCallien, this was in fact his father.

== Life ==
He was born in Tarbert, Argyll in 1902. He was educated locally then went to Glasgow University to study Sciences, where he graduated BSc in 1923.

He began lecturing in Geology soon after graduating and was awarded a doctorate (DSc) in 1930. In 1931 he was elected a Fellow of the Royal Society of Edinburgh. His proposers were Sir Edward Battersby Bailey, George Walter Tyrrell, Robert Alexander Houston and Thomas MacRobert. He won the Society's Neill Prize for the period 1939–1941.

He left Scotland in the mid-1930s to take up the post of Professor of Geology at Ankara University in Turkey. In 1950 he moved to the University of Accra in Ghana. He stayed there until retiral then returned to Scotland.

He died in Helensburgh on 19 January 1981.

== Publications ==
- The surface features of Kintyre (1929)
- Scottish Gem Stones (1937)
- Late Glacial and Early Post-Glacial Scotland (1937)
- The Geology of Glasgow and District (1938)
- The Structure of South Knapdale
- Vitrification of Arkose
- A Visit to Sanda

== Known Artworks ==
See etc.

- From Tarbert, Loch Fyne
- Washing Nets, Tarbert
- Skiffs Discharging at Tarbert
- Mallaig
- Fishing Boats pulled up on a Beach

Eventide

== Family ==
In 1931 he married Catherine Duncan.
