= Louis Cheslock =

American violinist, composer and author

- Born: September 25, 1898; London, England
- Died: July 19, 1981 (aged 82); Baltimore, Maryland, U.S.
- Education: Peabody Institute
- Occupations: Violinist, composer
- Employer: Peabody Institute
- Spouse: Elise Hanline
- Children: 1 son

Louis Cheslock (September 25, 1898 – July 19, 1981) was a British-born American violinist, composer and author. He taught at the Peabody Institute in Baltimore, Maryland for six decades.

== Early life ==
Cheslock was born on September 25, 1898, in London. His parents were Polish immigrants, and Cheslock immigrated to the United States with them in 1901. He later became a U.S. citizen. He attended the Peabody Institute in Baltimore, Maryland, where he learned how to play the violin and took harmony and composition courses.

== Career ==
Cheslock taught at his alma mater, the Peabody Institute, for six decades. He composed "concertos, tone poems, symphonies, a ballet and an opera" and authored three books. His compositions were performed domestically and internationally, including in Belgium, India, Israel, Portugal, and Singapore.

Cheslock was a member of H. L. Mencken's Saturday Night Club from the 1920s to the 1950s.

== Personal life and death ==
With his wife, née Elise Hanline, Cheslock had a son, Barry.

Cheslock died of a heart attack on July 19, 1981, in Baltimore, Maryland.

== Selected works ==
- Cheslock, Louis (1931). Introductory Study on Violin Vibrato. Baltimore, Maryland: Peabody Conservatory. OCLC 1052922169.
- Cheslock, Louis (1948). Graded List of Some Useful Works for Violin Study. Baltimore, Maryland: Peabody Conservatory. OCLC 83300236.
- Cheslock, Louis (1961). H.L. Mencken on Music: A Selection of His Writings on Music. New York City: Schirmer Books. OCLC 500609790.
