= Charles Murison =

Major-General Charles Murison CB CBE MC
- Born: 7 October 1894; Grenfell, Saskatchewan, Canada
- Died: 31 October 1981 (aged 87); Canada
- Military career
- Allegiance: United Kingdom
- Branch: British Army
- Service years: 1914–1949
- Rank: Major-General
- Service number: 21180
- Unit: Royal Field Artillery
- Commands: South Wales District (1945)
- Conflicts: First World War; Second World War
- Awards: Companion of the Order of the Bath; Commander of the Order of the British Empire; Military Cross; Mentioned in Despatches

Major-General Charles Alexander Phipps Murison, CB, CBE, MC (7 October 1894 − 31 October 1981) was a Canadian-born British Army officer who served in both the First and Second World Wars.

== Military career ==
Born in Grenfell, Saskatchewan, Canada, on 7 October 1894, he was educated at Trinity College School and McGill university. Murison was commissioned into the Royal Field Artillery of the British Army in 1914, shortly after the outbreak of the First World War. His service during the war was spent overseas in Belgium and France where, in addition to being wounded, he was mentioned in despatches and awarded the Military Cross.

In common with a number of men of his generation who came to enjoy soldiering, Murison decided to remain in the army during the interwar period and was married in 1920. Spending the majority of the first few years of his military career between the wars in India, he went to England to attend the Staff College, Camberley, from 1928 to 1929. Ten years on from that, he was promoted to lieutenant colonel, after having served as an instructor at the Royal Military College of Canada from 1933 to 1934.

In 1940, the year after the Second World War began, Murison was promoted to brigadier. He saw service with the British Expeditionary Force in France, where he was an Assistant Quartermaster-General. After being evacuated from Dunkirk, he was promoted to acting major general on 1 January 1942, and became Director-General of Army Equipment at the War Office in June 1942, Deputy Quartermaster-General (Army Equipment) at the War Office in February 1943, a month after his major general's rank was made temporary, and Chief Administration Officer at Northern Command in 1945.

On account of his contribution at Dunkirk, Murison was appointed a Commander of the Order of the British Empire on 16 July 1940 and, on account of his considerable contribution to equipping the British Army during the Second World War, he was appointed a Companion of the Order of the Bath in the 1944 Birthday Honours.

He contributed to numerous articles to military journals throughout his life. He eventually retired back to his native Canada where his last remaining years were spent.

== Bibliography ==
- Smart, Nick (2005). Biographical Dictionary of British Generals of the Second World War. Barnesley: Pen and Sword Books. ISBN 1844150496.
