= Bernard Keen =

British soil scientist

- Born: 5 September 1890
- Died: 5 August 1981 (aged 90)
- Awards: Fellow of the Royal Society
- Scientific career
- Fields: Soil scientist
- Institutions: University College London

Sir Bernard Augustus Keen FRS (5 September 1890 – 5 August 1981) was a British soil scientist and Fellow of University College London. He was elected a Fellow of the Royal Society in 1935.
