= Philip Southwell =

Sir Charles Archibald Philip Southwell, CBE, MC, GCStJ (6 June 1894 – 30 November 1981), known as Sir Philip Southwell, was an English petroleum geologist and industrialist.

== Early life and education ==
Charles Archibald Philip Southwell was born in Calverley, Yorkshire, on 6 June 1894, the son of Charles Edward Southwell, a doctor, and Clare, née Beaumont. He was educated at Newcastle-under-Lyme High School, and in 1912, inspired by his father's friend Dr Wheelton Hind, Southwell joined the University of Birmingham to study petroleum technology, then a new course established by John Cadman (later Lord Cadman). Southwell enlisted in the Army in 1914 and served during the First World War with the Royal Artillery; he was awarded the Military Cross (MC) in 1918. After the war, he completed his studies at Birmingham and graduated in 1920 with a Bachelor of Science (BSc) degree.

== Career ==
After briefly working for an engineering contractor, Southwell worked as Petroleum Technologist to the Government of Trinidad (1922–28), before joining the Anglo-Persian Oil Company, which became British Petroleum, as a local manager of the Oilfields and Geology Branch (serving until 1944). His job entailed exploring the Middle East for oil deposits and he successfully predicted the presence of oilfields under [[Kuwait]]. During the Second World War, he was placed in charge of oil exploration in the United Kingdom (he took the rank of temporary Lieutenant-Colonel and was also on the Government Committee on Business Training in 1945), but with the war over he returned his sights to Kuwait. In 1946 he was invited to join the Kuwait Oil Company as Manager Director, serving until 1959. The company was jointly run by BP and the American company Gulf Oil; he was responsible for exploring and extracting Kuwaiti oil and oversaw the company's 15,000 employees. Family history states that Southwell secured this position by meeting with Sheikh Abdullah Mubarak Al-Sabah. Upon learning that Abdullah Al-Mubarak would visit a Kuwaiti spa resort, Southwell visited the same spa. After Southwell followed Abdullah Al-Mubarak at the spa for several days, Abdullah Al-Mubarak acknowledged Southwell and offered to meet with him. According to Southwell's obituary in the Journal of the Royal Society of Arts, "he developed the Kuwait oilfields so rapidly that Britain suffered little from the Iranian oil nationalization [in 1951]. He encouraged better relations with Middle Eastern countries and local control of oil resources, and deplored the invasion of Suez."

Southwell was President of the Institute of Petroleum for the 1951–52 year. He received the Silver Medal from the Royal Society of Arts in 1953 and the Institute of Petroleum's Cadman Memorial Medal in 1954. He was President (1960–80) of [[Brown and Root (UK) Limited]], Chairman of Highland Fabricators, which was Brown and Root's 185 acre construction yard on the Cromarty Firth at Nigg, from 1968 to 1980, and Director-General of St John Ambulance in 1968. He was appointed a Commander of the Order of the British Empire (CBE) in 1954 and a Knight Bachelor in 1958; he was also a Bailiff Grand Cross of the Order of St John (GCStJ). In 1926, he married Mary Burnett, daughter of Thomas Scarratt, of Ipstones. There were two sons of the marriage - John and Richard Southwell QC; she died in 1981, a matter of months before Southwell's own death on 30 November 1981.
