= Frank Harold Cleobury =

Philosopher and priest (b. 1892, d. 1981)

Frank Harold Cleobury (6 November 1892 – 25 March 1981) was a British idealist philosopher and priest.

Cleobury was born in London. He joined the British Civil Service in 1908. He studied philosophy and theology and obtained his BA (1932) and PhD (1941) from University of London. He was a conscientious objector and joined the Friends' Ambulance Unit. In 1950, he retired from public service as a principal in the administrative grade. He became an ordained priest in the Church of England in 1951. He was Rector of Hertingfordbury until his retirement in 1964.

Cleobury was influenced by the idealism of A. E. Taylor, Bernard Bosanquet and F. H. Bradley. He held the view that idealism was compatible with Christianity and provided a basis for religious belief. His book Christian Rationalism and Philosophical Analysis argued for a natural theology that was influenced by George Berkeley. He used arguments from idealism to defend theism against "20th century philosophical analysis." He wrote articles for The Philosopher, the journal of The Philosophical Society of England and served as President (1962-1977).

== Selected publications ==
- God, Man and the Absolute (1947)
- The Armour of Saul (1957
- Christian Rationalism and Philosophical Analysis (1959)
- Liberal Christian Orthodoxy (1963)
- A Return to Natural Theology (1967)
- From Clerk to Cleric (1976)
