= John Cecil Kelly-Rogers =

Irish aviation pioneer (1905–1981)

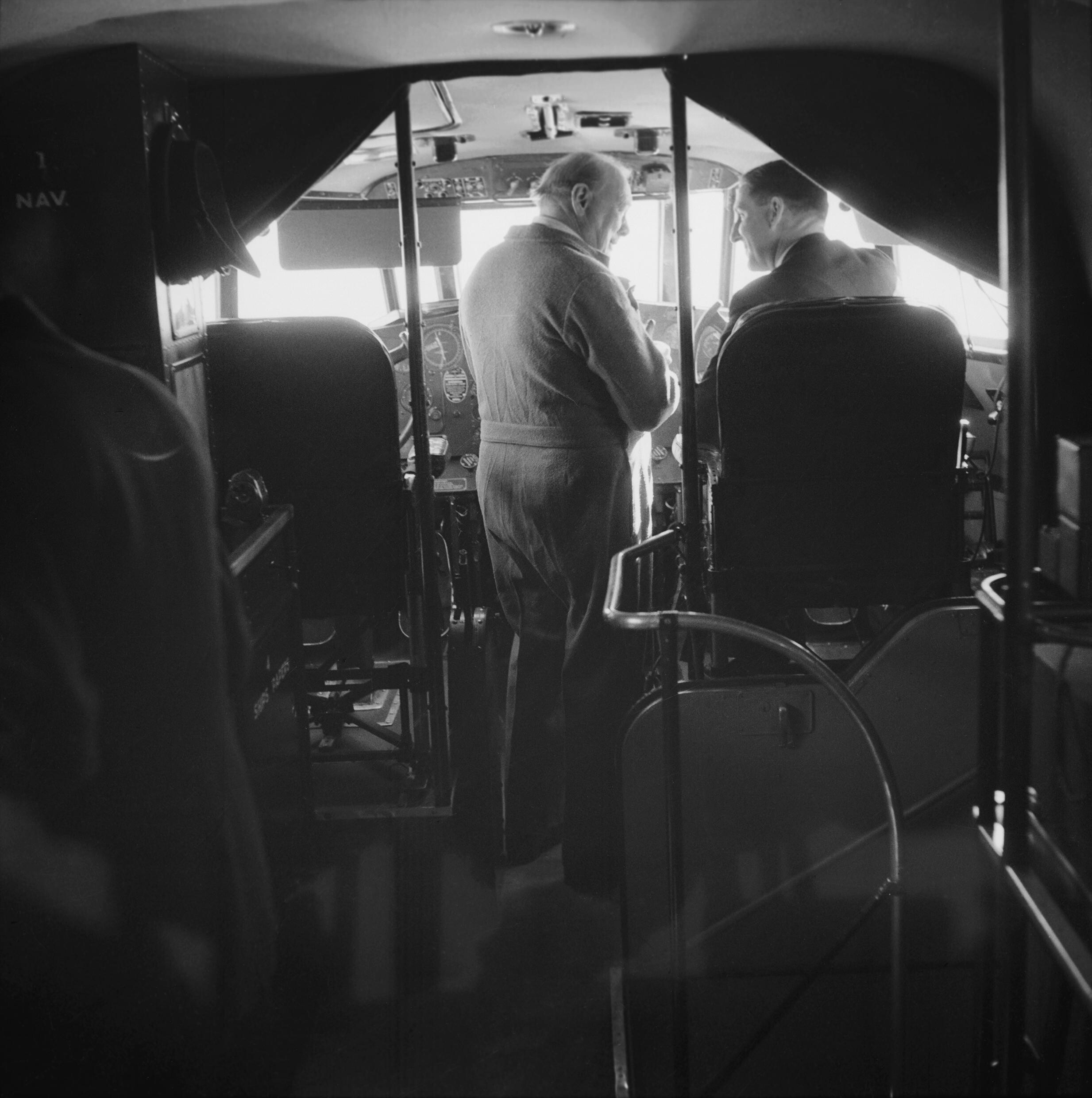
- Kelly-Rogers at the controls of Berwick while speaking to Churchill
- Born: 8 February 1905; Dún Laoghaire, County Dublin, Ireland
- Died: 29 January 1981 (aged 75); Dublin
- Occupation: pilot
- Spouse: Beryl Kelly-Rogers
- Awards: Order of the British Empire

John Cecil Kelly-Rogers (8 February 1905 – 29 January 1981) was a British aviator who flew Winston Churchill to wartime meetings.

== Early years ==
John Cecil Kelly-Rogers was the second child of sea captain Theodore and Violet Elizabeth Kelly-Rogers. John trained as a cadet on the frigate HMS Conway, sailing out of the River Mersey. At 19, a qualified second mate, he went into service on long-haul liner routes from England to Australia.

== Career ==
Kelly-Rogers was 22 when he left the sea and joined the RAF. In 1937 he quit the RAF for the growing commercial sector of aviation. He joined the fledgling airline, Imperial Airways, soon to become British Overseas Airways Corporation. He became Commanding Officer of the fleet of flying boats, ferrying passengers to Australia, South Africa and America. A year later, he tested the first in-flight re-fuelling of flying boats. He made the first scheduled west and eastbound airmail flights across the Atlantic by a European operator, landing at Foynes to be greeted by Éamon de Valera. In 1940 he flew the four-engine flying boat, Corsair, out of the narrow Dungu River in the Belgian Congo where it had been marooned for 10 months. That same year he flew the first passenger flight to and from the United States, and was the first overseas pilot to land at LaGuardia Airport.

== Churchill's pilot ==
The historic January 1942 flight on the British Boeing 314 flying boat, Berwick, came about after Churchill had insisted on a face-to-face meeting with President Roosevelt following the Japanese attack on Pearl Harbor. Churchill made the outward journey to Washington on the battleship Duke of York, a long and stormy crossing, after which both leaders plotted the war and Churchill addressed Congress. Hours after his speech came the first of many scares about Churchill's health when he suffered a mild heart attack.

Keen to avoid another long and hard sea voyage, Churchill and his party agreed to fly in the Berwick to the British colony of Bermuda on the first leg of their journey home, and meet the Duke of York there. During the flying boat's four-hour flight, Churchill was allowed to make a couple of slightly banked turns after taking the controls. He asked Captain Kelly Rogers: "What about flying from Bermuda to England? Can she carry enough petrol?" Kelly-Rogers replied: "Of course."

The day after landing at Bermuda, the aircraft, with Churchill, two Chiefs of Staff and Lord Beaverbrook, his Minister of Supply, among those on board, set off for England. Churchill, in his own account of the flight, wrote years later that he believed a navigational error had taken them to within "five or six minutes" of German gun batteries at Brest. In the nick of time, he claimed, they altered course but the aircraft was reported as a hostile bomber coming in from France and Fighter Command planes were ordered to shoot it down. In fact, at no time, according to Kelly-Rogers, were they within 90 miles of Brest. Churchill, with his amateur navigation, was confused as he sat in the co-pilot's seat with the nervous Lord Beaverbrook standing beside him.

Fighter Command at Rudloe Manor, near Bath, had been told to expect the VIP flight, and fighters from Perranporth were scrambled to help provide cover against any intruders from the south. But as the fighters patrolled the skies, radar detected what was thought to be an enemy bomber 30 miles west of Brest, and four Spitfires of 310 (Czech) Squadron were scrambled to intercept it. The suspected enemy bomber was a British Lockheed Hudson that had taken off from Cornwall's St Eval airstrip on a routine anti-shipping patrol off Brest. Meanwhile, the Berwick touched down uneventfully in Plymouth Sound. As Churchill debarked, Kelly Rogers said: "I never felt so much relieved in my life as when I landed you safely in harbor." Churchill later took the statement as evidence that the aircraft had in fact skirted close to Brest.

In all, Churchill made nearly 20 journeys outside the United Kingdom between 1941 and 1945. His wartime travels became a consuming passion, often to the detriment of his own health. "I won't be captured," he promised on board the Queen Mary liner. "The finest way to die is in the excitement of fighting the enemy."

== Post-war career ==
Kelly-Rogers joined Aer Lingus, where he worked until 1965. After retirement, he devoted the major part of his time to rescuing and collecting items of Irish aviation interest, and was primarily responsible for the creation of the Irish Aviation Museum, being its first and only honorary curator.
