= John Deane Potter =

John Deane Potter, born in Anglesey in Wales in October 1912, brought up in Liverpool, became a Fleet Street journalist, columnist and popular writer in the 1950s and 1960s. He died in Sidmouth on 19 March 1981, aged 68.

== Life and times ==
John Deane Potter was one of Fleet Street's most prodigious reporters in the post-war years, covering many of the major events including the trial of the Moors murders Myra Hindley and Ian Brady in 1966. He served in Burma and India during the Second World War as a newspaper correspondent. He was one of the first Western journalists to report from Hiroshima after the Atomic bomb was dropped on Japan in 1945, which is featured in his 1951 memoir, No Time for Breakfast.

He was a foreign correspondent for the Daily Express in London when the newspaper was the biggest selling newspaper in the UK. Potter's non-fictional accounts of events were among the popular books of their time. His biography on Isoroku Yamamoto, the Japanese admiral and mastermind of Pearl Harbor in December 1941, was one of the earliest contemporary publications. Potter's most successful books was "Admiral of the Pacific", first published in Britain. 13 editions were published between 1965 and 1972, while Fiasco, had 23 editions between 1970 and 1974, in English and German. According to Worldcat, Potter published 37 works in 121 publications in five languages.

He lived in Chelsea, London, and was twice married. His first wife, Eugenie Lee, a fellow journalist, appeared in several movies in Britain in the 1930s. She moved to the United States in 1940. Their daughter, Fenella, was born in the United States. His second wife was Eve Chapman, the fashion editor of the Daily Mirror and later agony aunt of the News of the World. His great-grandfather was William Abdullah Quilliam, who created England's first mosque and is an inspiration for the think-tank the Quilliam Foundation and the Abdullah Quilliam Society. He had four children, his eldest son, Seamus Potter, became chief sub-editor of the Evening Standard.

== Published works ==
- No Time for Breakfast: Memoir (1951),
- The Crocodile Trembles (Corgi Books, 1958),
- The Fatal Gallows Tree: An Account of the British Habit of Hanging (Elek Books, London, 1965),
- Admiral of the Pacific: The Life of Yamamoto (1965),
- A Soldier Must Hang: the biography of an Oriental General.
- The Monsters of the Moors: the full account of the Brady-Hindley case. (1966),
- Yamamoto: The Man Who Menaced America. (Viking Hardback), then (Paperback Library),
- The Art of Hanging (1969),
- Fiasco: The Break-out of the German Battleships (Heinemann, 1970) (Stein and Day, 1971). Paperback version was renamed Breakout: The Ultra-Secret Plan that Led to the Greatest Sea and Air Battle of All Time (Bantam War Book),
- Scotland Yard (1972),
- When the Guns of Navarone pointed at Britain (Extract from TVTimes book, 1976).
