= Hubert Hunt =

British flying ace (1898–1981)

Hubert Cecil Hunt
- Born: 18 September 1898; Manor Park, Essex, England
- Died: 11 January 1981 (aged 82); Harpenden, Hertfordshire, England
- Military career
- Allegiance: United Kingdom
- Branch: British Army; Royal Air Force
- Rank: Sergeant
- Units: Bedfordshire Regiment; No. 22 Squadron RAF
- Awards: Distinguished Flying Medal

Sergeant Hubert Cecil Hunt DFM (18 September 1898 – 11 January 1981) was a British World War I flying ace credited with eight aerial victories.

== Military service ==
Having first served in the Bedfordshire Regiment, by 1918 Hunt was serving as an observer/gunner in the Royal Air Force's No. 22 Squadron with the rank of Sergeant-Mechanic, flying in the Bristol F.2b.

He gained his first victory on 28 May 1918, driving down a two-seater over Merville–La Bassée, while being piloted by Lieutenant Chester William McKinley Thompson. On 8 August he destroyed two Fokker D.VII over Brebières with pilot Lieutenant Thomas Henry Newsome. His remaining victories were while flying with Lieutenant Cyril Edward Hurst, accounting for a two-seater over Fresnoy on 16 August, three fighters in a single action between Maricourt and Péronne on the 25th, and driving down a Fokker D.VII south of Vitry on the 31st.

Hunt was awarded the Distinguished Flying Medal, which was gazetted on 1 November 1918. His citation read:

P/6434 Serjt.-Mech. Hubert Cecil Hunt (late Bedf. R).

"A keen and skilful Observer, on whose courage and resource Pilots place absolute reliance. He has personally shot down and destroyed five enemy machines, two of which he accounted for during one patrol."
