= Henry Barnard (judge) =

British High Court judge (1891-1981)

Sir Henry Barnard

Justice of the High Court
- In office 1944–1958

Personal details
- Born: 18 April 1891
- Died: 20 July 1981 (aged 90)
- Education: Merton College, Oxford
- Occupation: Judge
- Profession: Law

Sir Henry William Barnard (18 April 1891 – 20 July 1981) was an English High Court judge, sitting in the Probate, Divorce and Admiralty Division.

== Early life ==
Henry William Barnard was born on 18 April 1891, son of William Tyndal Barnard, KC. He was the uncle of Sir Anthony Hollis, another High Court judge.

He was educated at Wellington College and Merton College, Oxford.

== War service ==
He served in World War I as a captain in the Royal West Kent Regiment (5th Battalion).

== Legal career ==
He as called to the Bar at Gray's Inn in 1913, before leaving for war service. He later returned and was made King's Counsel in 1939, in which year he also became a Bencher of the Inn. He became Treasurer in 1953.

== Judge ==
In 1944 he was made a judge of the High Court sitting in the Probate, Divorce and Admiralty Division, and was given the customary knighthood. He served for 14 years until his retirement in 1958.
