= Patrick Dunbar Ritchie =

British chemist (1907–1981)

Patrick Dunbar Ritchie FRSE FRSC FPRI LLD (1907–1981) was a 20th-century British chemist of Scots descent. Apart from being a noted chemist, he was an artist, fine art conservator, philatelist, ornithologist and mountaineer. His friends knew him as Pat Ritchie.

== Life ==
He was born on 17 April 1907 in London. His family moved back to Scotland in his youth and he was educated at Arbroath High School then the High School of Dundee.

In 1925 he began studying Chemistry at University College, Dundee, which was then a part of the University of St Andrews, graduating B.Sc in 1929. He then undertook postgraduate studies at Dundee gaining a PhD in 1932.

In 1950 he was given the Young chair in Technical Chemistry at the Royal Technical College in Glasgow.

In 1951 he was elected a fellow of the Royal Society of Edinburgh. His proposers were James Norman Davidson, James Wilfred Cook, John Monteath Robertson, and Harry Work Melville.

In 1964 he became the first chairman of the Department of Pure and Applied Chemistry when the Technical College became the University of Strathclyde.

He retired from Strathclyde in 1972 but then was appointed professor of chemistry at the University of Penang in Malaysia. In 1978 he was awarded an honorary doctorate of LL.D from Dundee University.

He died at St Albans on 1 November 1981.

== Publications ==
- A Chemistry of Plastics and High Polymers (1949)
- Physics of Plastics (1965)
- Plasticisers, Stabilisers and Fillers (1967)

== Family ==
He married twice, first to Janet Sinclair, secondly to Gwen Hewett.
