= Helen Adelaide Lamb =

Scottish artist (1893–1981)

- Born: 17 January 1893; Prestwick, Scotland
- Died: 28 March 1981 (aged 88); Dunblane, Scotland
- Known for: Embroidery, Painting
- Awards: Lauder Prize, 1924, 1931, 1953

Helen Adelaide Lamb (17 January 1893 – 28 March 1981) was a Scottish artist known for her embroidery and paintings. She won the Lauder Prize in 1924, 1931 and 1953.

== Life ==
Helen Adelaide Lamb was born in Prestwick on 1893. Her father was Tom Richney Lamb (born c. 1853) and her mother was Agnes McArthur Cook (born c. 1868). Helen was the eldest of their 4 daughters.

Lamb gave evidence in 1950 to a 'right of way' case through the Newton Farm in Dunblane, which was being denied by a padlocked gate. The case went all the way to the Court of Session in Edinburgh. Lamb said she used the way constantly and she used to swing on the gates as a little girl.

Lamb died 'quietly at her home in West Ridge' on 28 March 1981 in Dunblane.

== Art ==
Lamb was admitted to the Glasgow School of Art in 1908, at age 15.

Lamb became the art mistress of St. Columba's School, Kilmacolm, in 1918. She illuminated a panel for the long service of the former headteacher Miss Waugh. It was noted that Lamb had already worked on the Roll of Honour in St Cuthbert's Church, Edinburgh; the Roll of Honour in Dunblane Cathedral; and the Cradle Roll for the Church of Scotland.

In 1924 she exhibited at the Royal Scottish Academy At The Edge Of The Loch. She joined the Glasgow Society of Lady Artists, and in their 1926 exhibition she illuminated a poem by John Oxenham.

Lamb's painting Corner Of A Garden was shown in the 1935 Stirling Art Exhibition. At the 1938 Stirling Art Exhibition she exhibited Early Spring. She also exhibited at the RGI exhibition at Kelvingrove Art Gallery in 1942.

Lamb designed and executed the address for King George V on his Silver Jubilee in 1935, and the addresses of the Church of Scotland to King Edward VIII, King George VI, and Queen Elizabeth II on their accessions to the throne. She also emblazoned the burgess ticket that was presented to the then-Princess Elizabeth in 1947 at Stirling.

Lamb won the Lauder Prize for the Glasgow Society of Lady Artists exhibition of 1953. In 1961 she exhibited at the RSA The Old Summer House.

Lamb designed birthday cards for the pupils at the Church of Scotland Sunday school in Dunblane.

Lamb's embroidery is on display at the Victoria and Albert Museum with her panel of a redhead, circa 1909.

Lamb's work is seen as part of a Scottish embroidery revival in the twentieth century, which was European in its outlook. The Scottish [arts and crafts movement] was relatively forward looking, contemporary and much more European based. It should always be born in mind that the Scottish Arts & Crafts movement had more in common with the Wiener Werkstatte for example than it ever did with the English Arts & Crafts movement.
