= John Lambe (M5 rapist) =

British rapist

John Lambe (born 1944), known as the M5 rapist, is a British serial rapist who worked as a builder and lorry driver.

He was born in Fordingbridge, Hampshire.

From 1975 until his arrest in 1980, he was responsible for a string of sex attacks on women aged between 15 and 74 in the Bristol and Taunton areas which adjoin the M5 motorway in South West England. He was arrested after the husband of one of his victims recognised him and his vehicle leaving the scene of the crime in Taunton.

In 1981, he was found guilty of twelve counts of rape and six charges of attempted rape, and jailed for life. The prosecution at his trial alleged that the motivation for his crimes stemmed from a vitriolic hatred of the police, against whom he had waged a personal vendetta since a conviction for aggravated burglary in 1975. He remains in prison to this day.
