= British Forces casualties in Afghanistan (2001–2021) =

British casualties in Afghanistan, 2001–2021

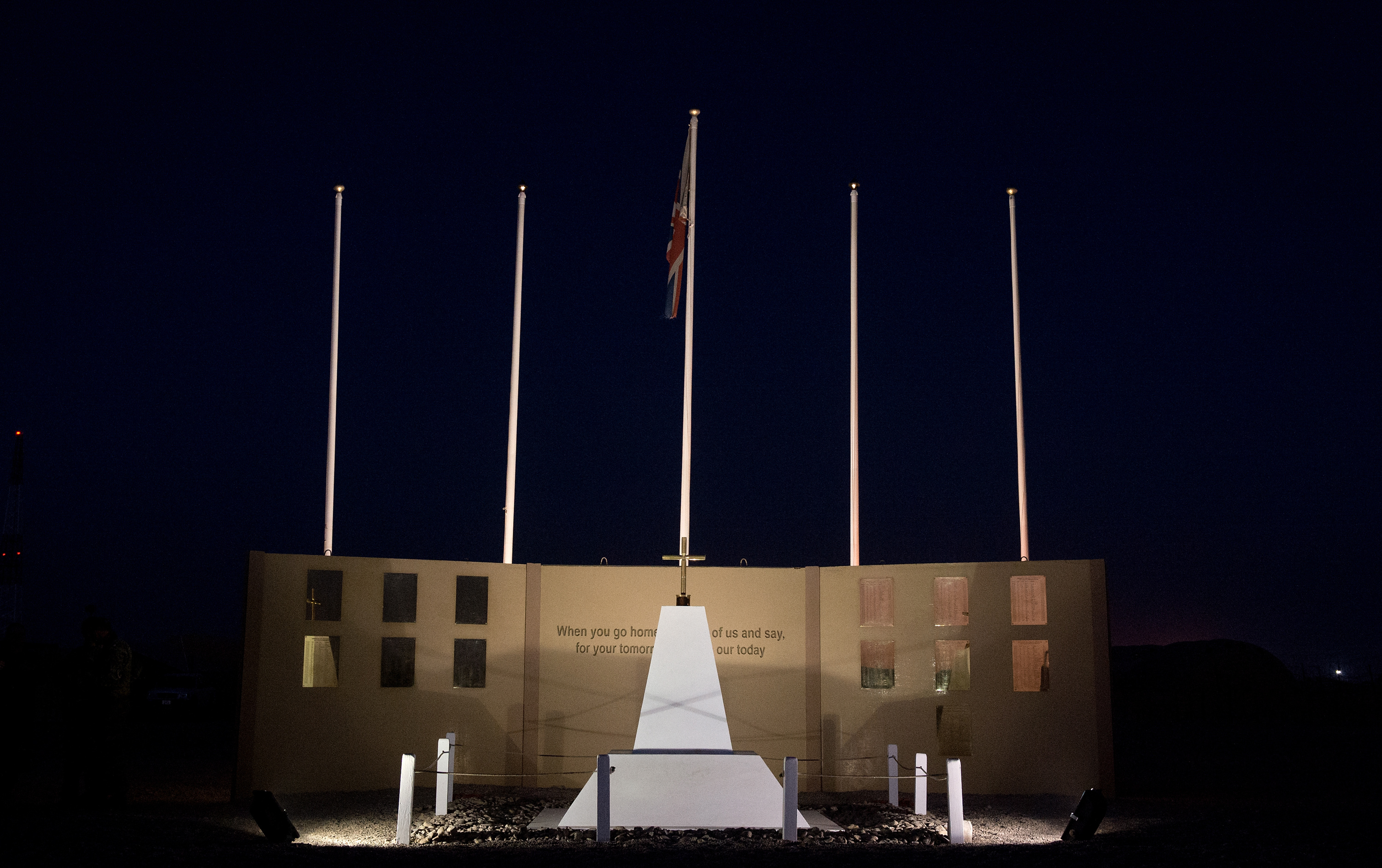
Memorial Wall at Camp Bastion

The British Armed Forces were militarily involved in Afghanistan between 2001 and 2021 as part of an international coalition in the War in Afghanistan (2001–2021). The United Kingdom was one of the first countries to take part in the American-led Operation Enduring Freedom against the Taliban regime. Its first combat operation was Operation Veritas (2001–02), followed by Operation Herrick (2002–14), which lasted for 13 years and represents the bulk of Britain's involvement. After 2014, the UK held two non-combat missions: Operation Toral (2015–21) and Operation Pitting (2021).

There have been a total of 457 fatalities of British Forces personnel in Afghanistan, including Ministry of Defence (MoD) civilians, during the entire period. The vast majority of fatalities took place after the redeployment of British forces to the Taliban stronghold of Helmand province; before this deployment, only five men had died between April 2002 and early March 2006.

In all, 404 of the fatalities are classed as killed "as a result of hostile action" and 51 are known to have died as a result of either illness, non-combat injuries or accidents, or have not yet officially been assigned a cause of death pending the outcome of an investigation. The Army saw the heaviest losses, with 362 fatalities as of 1 May 2013. Typically those killed were aged between 20 and 29 and the biggest losses seen in 2009 and 2010. Of those killed, 439 were male and three were female.

For the period 1 January 2006 to 31 March 2013 centrally available records show that:

- 2,116 UK military and civilian personnel were admitted to UK Field Hospitals and categorised as Wounded in Action, including as a result of hostile action.
- 4,529 UK military and civilian personnel were admitted to UK Field Hospitals for disease or non-battle injuries.
- 293 UK personnel were categorised as Very Seriously Injured from all causes excluding disease.
- 298 UK personnel were categorised as Seriously Injured from all causes excluding disease.
- 6,663 UK personnel were aeromedically evacuated from Afghanistan on medical grounds, for whatever reason.

== Background ==
See Operation Toral, Operation Herrick, and Operation Veritas.

== Supporting invasion of Afghanistan and serving in the Northern NATO command ==
=== Non-hostile deaths ===
The first three British casualties were non-hostile deaths in Kabul, from suicide, accidental weapons discharge and homicide.

During 2002, Private Darren John George, aged 23, from the Royal Anglian Regiment, was killed by a ricocheting bullet fired by a comrade who had a dizzy spell.

During August 2002, Sergeant Robert Busuttil and Corporal John Gregory, both aged 30 and both from the Royal Logistic Corps (RLC), were killed. Despite orders rationing beer to just two small cans a day to help prevent such events occurring, Corporal Gregory became involved in a drunken fight with Sergeant Busuttil at a barbecue. Gregory then left the barbecue and returned with a loaded SA80 rifle and killed Busuttil, firing the rifle at him "up to ten times". Gregory then committed suicide with the weapon. The Army was subsequently criticised by Wiltshire coroner David Masters when he recorded verdicts of unlawful killing on the death of Sergeant Busuttil and suicide on Corporal Gregory.

=== 2004 Kabul suicide attack ===
On 28 January 2004, Private Jonathan Kitulagoda, aged 23, from the Rifle Volunteers TA was killed, and four others injured, in a suicide attack in Kabul. The British troops were in armoured [LTV] vehicles when a taxi swerved into their convoy and a bomber detonated 200Ibs of explosives.

=== Mazar e-Sharif attack ===
On 29 October 2005, Lance Corporal Steven Sherwood, aged 23, of the 1st Battalion, the Royal Gloucestershire, Berkshire and Wiltshire Regiment, was killed, and five others wounded, by a lone gunman outside the main mosque in the former Northern Alliance stronghold of Mazar e-Sharif. Because of its northerly situation, it is unlikely that the Taliban were involved. The gunman attacked the soft-skinned 4×4 vehicle in which the soldiers were travelling, just a few hundred yards from the famous blue mosque. The gunman was arrested straight after the incident and was convicted and jailed for the murder of L/Cpl Sherwood.

=== 2006 Kabul incidents ===
On 9 August 2006, Private Leigh Reeves aged 25, from the Royal Logistic Corps, died in a road traffic accident at Camp Souter, Kabul. There was no insurgent involvement.

On 4 September 2006 Private Craig O'Donnell, aged 24, B Company of The Argyll and Sutherland Highlanders, 5th Battalion the Royal Regiment of Scotland died in a suicide bomb attack on the Snatch Land Rover he was travelling in.

== As part of Operation Enduring Freedom ==
=== March 2006 ===
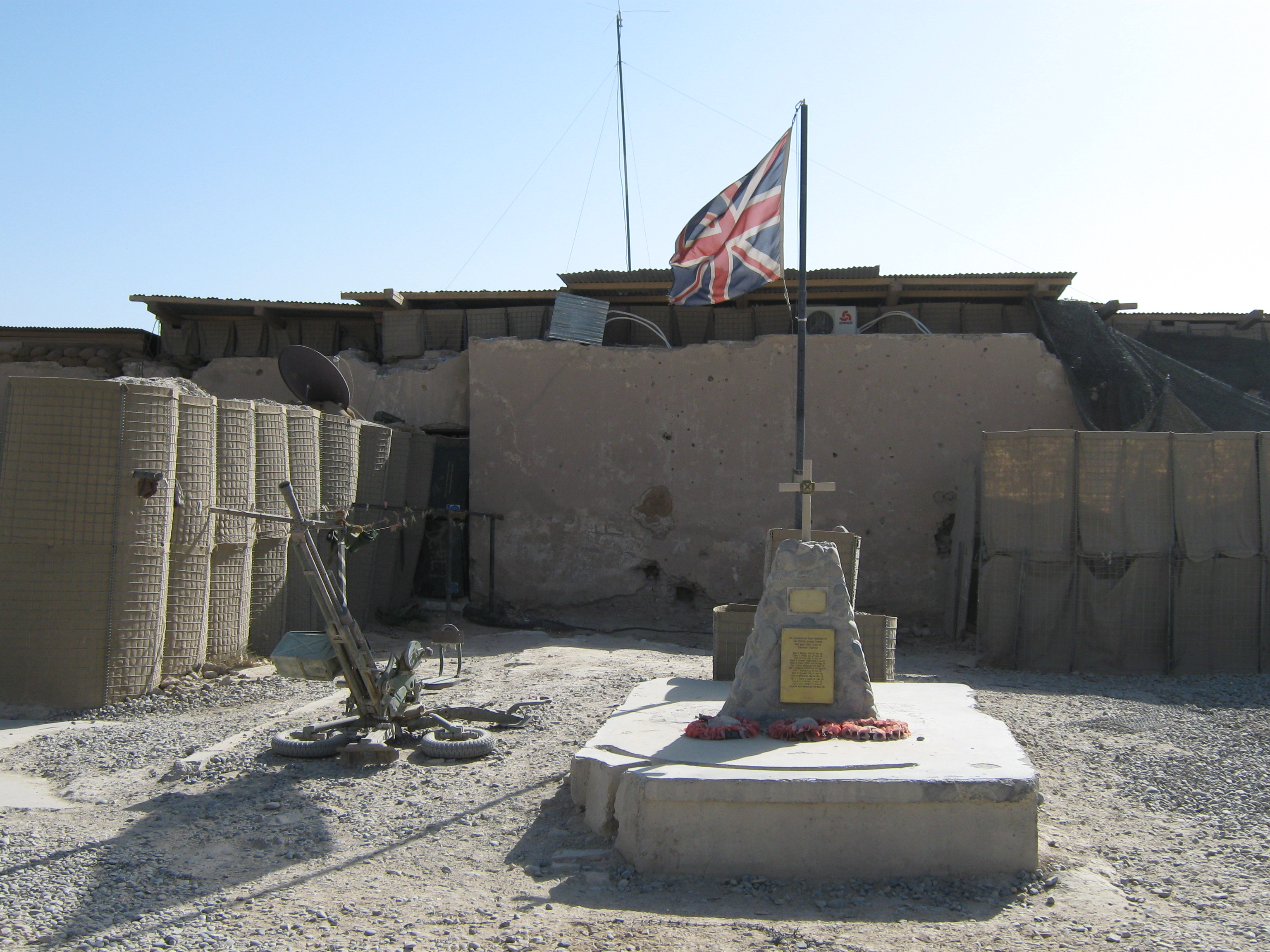
Memorial at FOB Delhi

On 22 March, Corporal Mark Cridge, aged 25, from 7 Signal Regiment died in Camp Bastion, Afghanistan. The Oxfordshire Coroner subsequently recorded an inquest verdict of suicide on 22 February 2007.

On 27 March, Lance Corporal Peter Edward Craddock, aged 31, from 1st Battalion, the Royal Gloucestershire, Berkshire and Wiltshire Regiment died in Lashkar Gah, southern Afghanistan. L/Cpl Craddock died as a result of a road traffic accident when a Land Rover he was using to cover for a patrol hit a tractor that turned into his path.

=== June 2006 ===
On 11 June, Captain Jim Philippson, aged 29, from 7 Parachute Regiment, Royal Horse Artillery, was killed in a gunbattle with suspected Taliban militants while he participated in a mobile patrol.

On 27 June, Captain David Patton, aged 38, who was a member of the Special Reconnaissance Regiment (SRR) and Sergeant Paul Bartlett, aged 35, who was a member of the Special Boat Service (SBS) were killed near the town of Sangin, Helmand Province, Southern Afghanistan. Having been forced to abandon their "Snatch" Land Rover after it was struck by an RPG they were then engaged in a fierce firefight with Taliban forces during which both men were killed. The soldiers were taking part in an operation to detain a number of leading Taliban figures within the Sangin Valley.

=== July 2006 ===
On 1 July, Corporal Peter Thorpe, aged 27, of 14 Signal Regiment and Lance Corporal Jabron Hashmi, aged 24, of the Intelligence Corps. The two British soldiers and their Afghan interpreter Daoud were part of Light Electronic Warfare Team (LEWT). The three died, and a number of others were wounded when a Type 63 107mm Rocket hit the government compound they were defending in the town of Sangin. Lance Corporal Jabron Hashmi is the only British-Muslim soldier to be killed in either Iraq or Afghanistan.

On 5 July, Private Damien Raymond Jackson, aged 19, from 3rd Battalion, the Parachute Regiment, died as a result of injuries sustained during a firefight with Taliban forces at approximately 1400 hours local time in Sangin, central Helmand Province. The incident occurred during a security patrol to clear a Helicopter landing site.

== Since ISAF Stage 3, 31 July 2006 ==
=== August 2006 to December 2006 ===
==== August 2006 ====
Captain Alex Eida, 2nd Lieutenant Ralph Johnson and Lance Corporal Ross Nicholls were killed after a vehicle patrol was ambushed by militants in a northern district of Helmand province in southern Afghanistan on 1 August, they were ambushed with RPGs, AK-47s and a heavy machine gun.

Private Andrew Barrie Cutts of 13 Air Assault Support Regiment was taking part in an action in Musa Qala, Helmand province, against insurgents when he was killed on 6 August. Troops came under "substantial fire" from Taliban during the operation, which involved 500 British troops, which was their largest action against the Taliban and the operation was supported by Afghan forces. This resupply, codenamed Operation Snakebite, and Private Cutts' death, are detailed in the book Hellfire by Apache pilot Ed Macy.

Lance Corporal Sean Tansey, aged 26, of the Household Cavalry Regiment, died as he repaired a damaged Scimitar tank at a military base in Helmand province on 12 August. This was subsequently found to be due to negligence on the part of the British Ministry of Defence, because the MoD failed to provide his regiment with proper equipment and training.

Corporal Bryan Budd, of the 3rd Battalion, the Parachute Regiment, died in a gun battle with Taliban forces in Helmand province, southern Afghanistan, on 20 August. He had been in the Army for 10 years serving in Yugoslavia, Sierra Leone, Macedonia, Afghanistan and Iraq and was about to be promoted to platoon sergeant when he died. He was posthumously awarded the Victoria Cross for his actions.

Lance Corporal Jonathan Hetherington of 14 Signal Regiment was shot dead while fighting rebels during an assault on his platoon house in Musa Qaleh in northern Helmand province on 27 August.

==== September 2006 ====
Ranger Anare Draiva of 1 Royal Irish Regiment, who was Fijian, died on 1 September in northern Helmand following an attack by insurgents.

RAF Nimrod crash

Fourteen British servicemen were killed when their Nimrod surveillance aircraft crashed following an on-board fire. The fire was caused when a fuel transfer pipe inside the aircraft ruptured during in-flight refuelling. The aircraft was serialed XV230 and was crewed by RAF Flight personnel drawn from No 120 Squadron at RAF Kinloss. The dead were named as Flt Lt Steven Johnson, Flt Lt Leigh Anthony Mitchelmore, Flt Lt Gareth Nicholas, Flt Lt Allan Squires, Flt Lt Steven Swarbrick, Flt Sgt Gary Andrews, Flt Sgt Stephen Beattie, Flt Sgt Gerard Bell, Flt Sgt Adrian Davis, Sergeant Benjamin James Knight, Sergeant John Joseph Langton and Sergeant Gary Paul Quilliam. Also operational on board the aircraft were personnel from the British Army and the Royal Navy; they were Corporal Oliver Simon Dicketts of the Parachute Regiment and Marine Joseph David Windall of the Royal Marines, who were both serving with the Special Reconnaissance Regiment.

Corporal Mark William Wright, aged 27, from Edinburgh, of the Parachute Regiment, died after a patrol entered an unmarked minefield in Helmand province on 6 September. Cpl Wright died attempting to save the life of an injured paratrooper. He was later awarded the George Cross posthumously.

Lance Corporal Paul Muirhead, aged 29, of the Royal Irish Regiment, from Bearley, Warwickshire, died of injuries on 6 September, after an attack on 1 September. He was wounded during a Taliban attack on his base at Musa Quala, in Helmand province. He had been receiving specialist medical care since the attack and his parents were with him when he died.

Lance Corporal Luke McCulloch, aged 21, of the 1st Battalion, the Royal Irish Regiment, was killed in a battle with Taliban rebels on 6 September. The fighting took place in Sangin, Helmand province.

==== October 2006 ====
Marine Gary Wright, aged 22, serving with Reconnaissance Troop, 45 Commando Royal Marines, was killed along with two children on 19 October 2006 when a suicide bomber on foot detonated explosives next to the Snatch Land Rover in which Wright was travelling; one other Royal Marine was seriously injured.

==== December 2006 ====
Marine Jonathan Wigley, of Zulu Company, 45 Commando, Royal Marines, was killed during a four-hour battle with the Taliban on the outskirts of the village of Garmsir in Helmand province, Southern Afghanistan. Marine Wigley's death is believed to be the result of friendly fire which occurred when air support for ground troops was called to within a range termed "Danger close".

Marine Richard Watson, of K Company, 42 Commando Royal Marines was killed on 12 December during a fierce firefight with Taliban fighters in the town of Now Zad in Helmand Province, Southern Afghanistan.

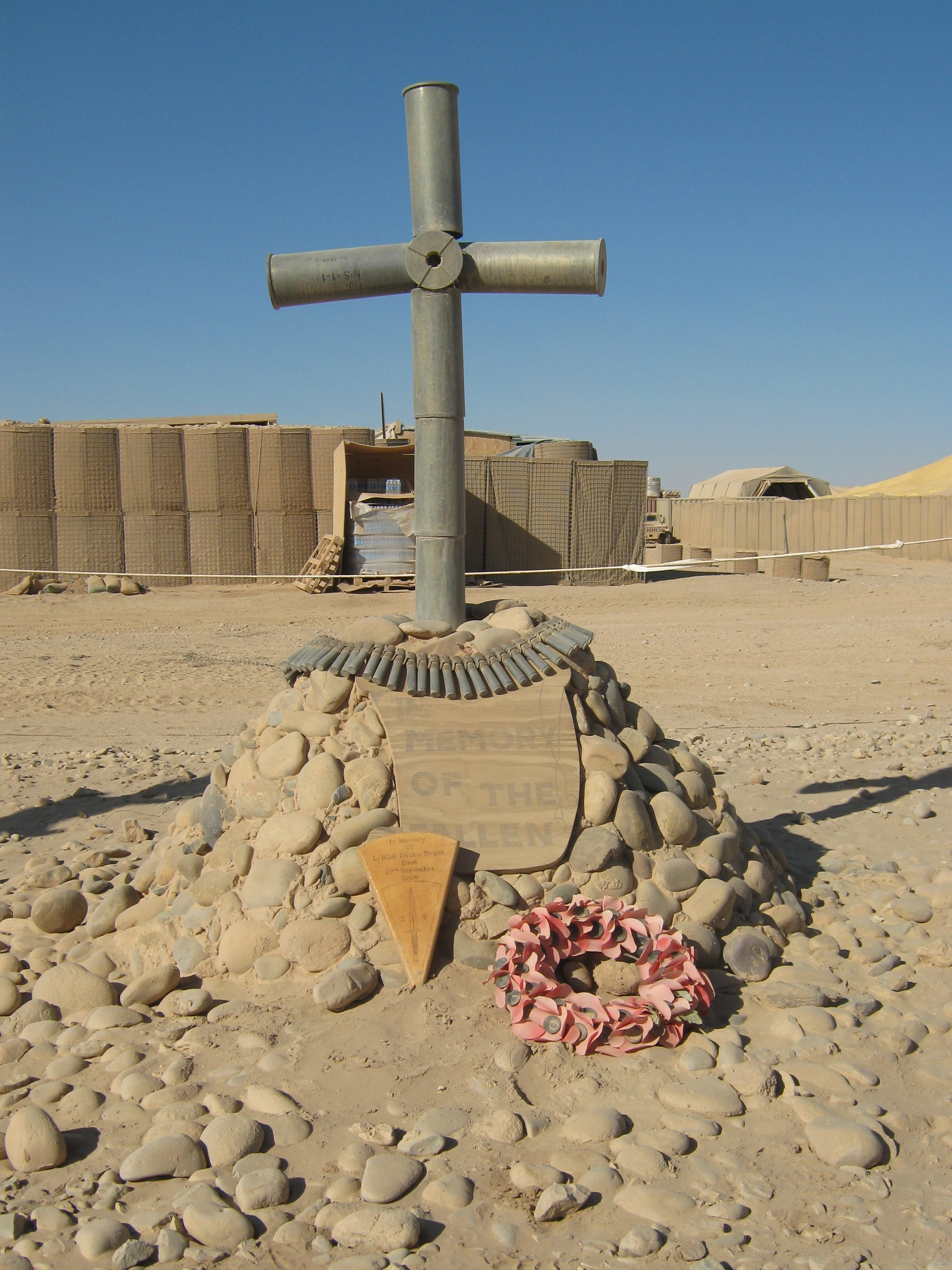
Dwyer memorial on Camp Dwyer

Lance Bombardier James Dwyer, of 29 Commando Regiment, Royal Artillery died on Wednesday 27 December 2006, aged 22. He was killed when the vehicle he was driving struck an anti-tank mine while on a patrol in southern Helmand. Various reports give the crew as four—the normal complement for a Snatch Land Rover—although another report describes the vehicle as a WMIK.

=== January 2007 to December 2007 ===
==== January 2007 ====
Marine Thomas Curry, aged 21, died on Saturday 13 January 2007 when elements of 42 Commando Royal Marines were engaged in a deliberate offensive operation near Kajaki, in Northern Helmand, Afghanistan. The Royal Marines Commandos were engaged in close-quarter fighting with the Taliban, and it was during this action that Marine Curry was killed. He died instantly as a result of enemy small arms fire.

Lance Corporal Mathew Ford, aged 30, from 45 Commando Royal Marines, died on Monday 15 January 2007. Lance Corporal Ford died when elements of 45 Commando Royal Marines were engaged in a deliberate offensive operation to the south of Garmsir in southern Helmand, Afghanistan. The Royal Marine Commandos were attacking a major Taliban fort, and during the initial breach of the compound Lance Corporal Ford was shot and killed instantly. Subsequent investigation by the British MOD, and a review by a Board of Enquiry into the evidence collected, found that LCpl Ford was most likely a victim of 'Friendly fire'. This was featured in the book "Apache" by Ed Macy.

==== February 2007 ====
Marine Jonathan Holland, aged 23, from 45 Commando was killed by an anti-personnel mine during a routine patrol in the Sangin District of Helmand province on 21 February 2007.

Marine Scott Summers, age 23, of 42 Commando Royal Marines died on Wednesday 21 February 2007 as a result of injuries sustained in a road traffic accident earlier that month in Afghanistan. The accident occurred when Marine Summers was driving a Pinzgauer High Mobility All-Terrain Vehicle as part of a routine convoy in Helmand province on 4 February 2007. After initial treatment, Marine Summers was transported back to a specialist unit in the UK where he later died.

==== March 2007 ====
Lance Bombardier Ross Clark, aged 25, from Zimbabwe, and Lance Bombardier Liam McLaughlin, aged 21 from Lancashire, both of 29 Commando Regiment Royal Artillery, were killed during a rocket attack in the Sangin area of Helmand province on Saturday 3 March 2007.

Marine Benjamin Reddy, aged 22, from Ascot in Berkshire, of 42 Commando Royal Marines was killed when his unit came under fire in the Kajaki area of Helmand Province on Tuesday 6 March 2007.

Warrant Officer Class 2 Michael Smith, aged 39, from Liverpool, serving with 29 Commando Regiment Royal Artillery died from injuries sustained when a grenade was fired at the UK base in Sangin, Helmand Province, on Thursday 8 March 2007.

==== April 2007 ====
Private Chris Gray, aged 19, from Leicestershire, a soldier of A Company, 1st Battalion The Royal Anglian Regiment, was killed in action while fighting the Taliban in Helmand Province, Afghanistan on Friday 13 April 2007. Pte Gray was taking part in a clearance patrol in the town of Now Zad when it was attacked by the Taliban who were using small arms, heavy machine guns, rocket-propelled grenades, mortars and rockets in their attack on the patrol. Lead elements of the patrol were pinned down by enemy fire and Private Gray's Platoon manoeuvred to support their comrades and out-flank the enemy. As they manoeuvred, Private Gray's section engaged a group of armed Taliban fighters at a range of just 15 metres. A fierce firefight ensued, during which a small number of Taliban were killed. During the battle Pte Gray was shot and despite receiving medical aid, he was pronounced dead on arrival at the British Hospital at Camp Bastion.

==== May 2007 ====
Corporal Mike Gilyeat, aged 28, from the Royal Military Police, died on Wednesday 30 May 2007 when the American Chinook helicopter he was travelling in was shot down in the Kajaki area of northern Helmand.

Corporal Darren Bonner, aged 31, from Norfolk, died on Monday 28 May 2007, in Helmand Province, Afghanistan. Corporal Bonner was the lead Signaller serving with A (Norfolk) Company Group, 1 Royal Anglian Battlegroup, and had been travelling in a convoy roughly 11 km east of Hyderabad in the Gereshk region of Helmand Province when an explosion hit his vehicle.

Guardsman Daniel Probyn, aged 22, from Tipton, 1st Battalion the Grenadier Guards died on Saturday 26 May 2007 following an explosion during an offensive operation to clear a Taliban stronghold on the outskirts of the town of Garmsir, in Southern Helmand. Four soldiers from the battalion were also injured in the incident.

Lance Corporal George Russell Davey, aged 23, from Suffolk, was killed on Sunday 20 May 2007 as a result of injuries sustained in a tragic firearms accident at the British base in Sangin, Afghanistan. The Coroner's inquest at Lowestoft subsequently recorded a verdict of accidental death.

Guardsman Simon Davison, was killed by small arms fire while manning a checkpoint near the town of Garmsir in Helmand Province on Thursday 3 May 2007. He was from 1st Battalion Grenadier Guards, and was operating from FOB Delhi in Garmsir District Centre, southern Helmand Province. Guardsman Davison was aged 22 and from Newcastle upon Tyne.

==== June 2007 ====
Lance Corporal Paul "Sandy" Sandford, aged 23, from Nottingham, serving with 1st Battalion The Worcestershire and Sherwood Foresters, was killed while taking part in an offensive patrol with his company aimed at disrupting Taliban forces in the Upper Gereshk Valley area of Helmand Province on Wednesday 6 June 2007.

Guardsman Neil "Tony" Downes was killed on Saturday 9 June 2007 when his Snatch Land Rover vehicle was hit by an explosion on a patrol with the Afghan National Army close to the town of Sangin in Helmand province, Afghanistan. Guardsman Downes was aged 20 and from Manchester.

Drummer Thomas Wright, aged 21, from Ripley, Derbyshire, 1st Battalion The Worcestershire and Sherwood Foresters Regiment, was killed on Sunday 24 June 2007 when the Snatch Land Rover vehicle he was travelling in was caught in an explosion near Lashkar Gah, Helmand province. Four other soldiers were also injured in the explosion.

Captain Sean Dolan of the 1st Battalion, aged 40, The Worcestershire and Sherwood Foresters Regiment, died as a result of a mortar round in Helmand Province, Afghanistan, on Saturday 30 June 2007. Captain Dolan was acting as a liaison officer between the battalion and a joint US Task Force and Afghan National Army operation. Captain Dolan, and the forces that he was attached to, were observing a substantial force of Taliban fighters from the edge of a vantage point, when they came under fire from Taliban mortars. The first mortar round fatally wounded Captain Dolan and seriously injured a US soldier

==== July 2007 ====
Sergeant Dave Wilkinson, aged 33, from 19 Regiment Royal Artillery, serving with 1st Battalion Grenadier Guards died following an explosion during a routine joint patrol with the Afghan National Army in Gereshk, Helmand province on Sunday 1 July 2007. The patrol was conducting routine operations with the Afghan National Army when it was struck by an improvised explosive device. Although all the injured soldiers were quickly extracted by helicopter to the ISAF medical facility at Camp Bastion, Sergeant Wilkinson was pronounced dead on arrival. Four other members of the patrol were injured.

Guardsman Daryl Hickey from the 1st Battalion Grenadier Guards was killed in southern Afghanistan on Thursday 12 July 2007. Gdn Hickey was part of a fire team providing covering fire as others in his platoon assaulted a Taliban position. During the enemy contact he suffered a gunshot wound. Gdn Hickey was rapidly evacuated by helicopter but was pronounced dead on arrival at the field hospital. Two other soldiers were injured in the action.

Lance Corporal Alex Hawkins, aged 22, of 1st Battalion The Royal Anglian Regiment, was killed in southern Afghanistan on Wednesday 25 July 2007.

Guardsman David Atherton from the 1st Battalion Grenadier Guards was killed in southern Afghanistan on Thursday 26 July 2007.

Sergeant Barry Keen of 14 Signal Regiment was killed by a 107 mm rocket when it hit the compound near Hydarabad in southern Afghanistan on Friday 27 July 2007.

Lance Corporal Michael Jones Royal Marines was killed in action during operations in southern Afghanistan on Sunday 29 July 2007.

==== August 2007 ====
Senior Aircraftman Christopher Bridge, aged 20, and serving with C flight, 51 Squadron Royal Air Force Regiment. At a little after midnight on the morning of 30 August 2007 (local time) SAC Bridge was in a vehicle that was conducting a routine security patrol around Kandahar Airfield when it was caught in an explosion. A local interpreter was also killed and two other soldiers were injured.

Private Aaron James McClure, Private Robert Graham Foster and Private John Thrumble all from 7 Platoon, B "SUFFOLK" Company, 1st Battalion The Royal Anglian Regiment, were killed in Afghanistan on Thursday 23 August 2007. During a fighting patrol north west of Kajaki, in northern Helmand Province, southern Afghanistan, 7 platoon came under determined and accurate fire from the Taliban. A fierce firefight ensued and air support was requested and was supplied by two USAF F15E Aircraft, one of which dropped a bomb short of the intended target area killing the three soldiers.

Captain David Hicks (MC), aged 26, Second-In-Command of C (Essex) Company, 1st Battalion The Royal Anglian Regiment was killed on Saturday 11 August 2007 during a violent attack on his patrol base north east of Sangin, in Helmand Province. At 1320 hours local time the patrol base came under attack from small arms fire, rocket-propelled grenades, and indirect fire. It was during this engagement that Captain Hicks was injured by shrapnel, but he refused medical treatment and morphine so that he could continue to lead his besieged troops against the Taliban. An emergency response helicopter later took him to the medical facility at Camp Bastion for treatment, but he did not survive his injuries. Captain Hicks was later posthumously awarded a Military Cross for his heroism in the incident.

Private Tony Rawson, aged 27, from 11 Platoon, C (Essex) Company, 1st Battalion The Royal Anglian Regiment on Friday 10 August 2007. Pte Rawson was part of a fighting patrol which came under heavy fire from Taliban fighters shortly before 0600 hours local time. He was pronounced dead at the scene of the firefight.

==== September 2007 ====
Private Damian Wright and Private Ben Ford. Wednesday 5 September 2007. The soldiers, both from the 2nd Battalion The Mercian Regiment (Worcesters and Foresters), were taking part in a routine reassurance patrol 17 km north of Lashkar Gah when, shortly after 0915 hours local time, the Land Rover vehicle they were travelling in was caught in an explosion. They were both pronounced dead at the scene. Another soldier and an interpreter were injured in the explosion Private Damian Wright and Private Ben Ford killed in Afghanistan.

Sergeant Craig Brelsford, aged 25, and Private Johan Botha, aged 25, both from 2nd Battalion The Mercian Regiment (Worcesters and Foresters), were killed in Helmand Province on Saturday 8 September 2007. They were taking part in a pre-planned operation to disrupt Taliban activity, south of Garmsir, southern Helmand Province, when their patrol was attacked by enemy fighters Sergeant Craig Brelsford and Private Johan Botha killed in Afghanistan. A number of other soldiers were also injured in the incident, two seriously.

Corporal Ivano Violino from 36 Engineer Regiment died in Helmand province, southern Afghanistan on Monday 17 September 2007. He was 29 years old. Corporal Violino was commanding an FL12 Self-Loading Dump Truck on a routine logistics convoy, moving vital engineering equipment to a Forward Operating Base 19 km north east of the town of Gereshk in Helmand province, when his vehicle was caught in an explosion Corporal Ivano Violino killed in Afghanistan.

Colour Sergeant Phillip Newman, aged 36, 4th Battalion The Mercian Regiment, and Private Brian Tunnicliffe aged 33, 2nd Battalion The Mercian Regiment (Worcesters and Foresters), died in a tragic accident in southern Afghanistan on Thursday 20 September 2007. They were travelling in a Pinzgauer High Mobility All-Terrain Vehicle, 5 km south west of their patrol base in an area north of Gereshk, on their way to a rendezvous point as part of a two vehicle replenishment patrol. The vehicle over-turned and landed on its roof in an irrigation channel. One other passenger was able to escape without injury Colour Sergeant Phillip Newman & Private Brian Tunnicliffe killed in Afghanistan.

==== October 2007 ====
Major Alexis Roberts, serving with 1st Battalion The Royal Gurkha Rifles (but usually an Officer of 2nd Battalion RGR) died as a result of an improvised explosive device in southern Afghanistan on Thursday 4 October 2007 Major Alexis Roberts of RGR killed in Afghanistan.

==== November 2007 ====
Lance Corporal Jake Alderton, aged 22, from Bexley, of 36 Engineer Regiment died in southern Afghanistan on Friday 9 November 2007 the vehicle he was travelling in left the road and rolled off a bridge Lance Corporal Jake Alderton of 36 Engineer Regiment killed in Afghanistan.

Captain John McDermid, The Royal Highland Fusiliers, 2nd Battalion The Royal Regiment of Scotland, aged 43, from Glasgow. On Wednesday 14 November 2007 in southern Afghanistan Captain McDermid, who was serving with 2nd Battalion The Yorkshire Regiment, was leading a joint UK and Afghan National Army patrol to the south of the district centre of Sangin in Helmand Province, during which he was also mentoring an Afghan National Army officer in the leadership and infantry skills that platoon commanders need. At approximately 1130 hours local time an Improvised Explosive Device detonated, which resulted in the death of Captain McDermid and serious injury to the Afghan interpreter who was accompanying him.Captain John McDermid killed in Afghanistan

==== December 2007 ====
Sergeant Lee Johnson of 2nd Battalion The Yorkshire Regiment (Green Howards). On Saturday 8 December 2007, in southern Afghanistan. Shortly before 1010 hours local time Sergeant Johnson was taking part in operations to recapture the town of Musa Qaleh in Helmand Province in what has become known as the Battle of Musa Qala when an explosive device detonated—suspected to be a mine—resulting in the death of Sergeant Johnson and inflicting serious injuries to another soldier in the same Pinzgauer Vector.Sergeant Lee Johnson of 2nd Battalion The Yorkshire Regiment killed in Afghanistan Sergeant Johnson was subsequently "Mentioned In Dispatches" for his actions.Operational Honours and Awards List: 25 July 2008

=== January 2008 to December 2008 ===
==== January 2008 ====
Trooper Jack Sadler, aged 21, of the Honourable Artillery Company. While serving with 4/73 Special Observation Battery, Brigade Reconnaissance Force Tpr Sadler was killed in an explosion in southern Afghanistan on 4 December 2007. At just before 1300 hrs local time the soldiers were on a tactical patrol escorting two light guns and the ammunition for these guns, in support of the forthcoming attack on Musa Qala, to the north of Sangin, Helmand Province, when the vehicle they were travelling in was caught in an explosion. Two other soldiers were also injured as a result of the blast, one had his back broken. At the inquest of Trooper Sadler it was ascertained that the two guns could have been flown in by helicopter.Trooper Jack Sadler killed in Afghanistan

Corporal Darryl Gardiner, also serving with 4/73 battery Royal Artillery, but a member of the Royal Electrical and Mechanical Engineers, aged 25 from Salisbury in Wiltshire, was taking part in an operation to disrupt enemy forces and reassure local Afghans on Sunday 20 January 2008 in southern Afghanistan, three kilometres north of Musa Qala district centre in Helmand Province. Shortly after 1530 hours local time the vehicle he was travelling in was hit by a roadside mine strike. Corporal Gardiner was evacuated by helicopter to the field hospital at Camp Bastion for medical treatment but did not survive. Five other soldiers were injured in the explosion.Corporal Darryl Gardiner killed in Afghanistan

==== February 2008 ====
Corporal Damian Stephen Lawrence, 2nd Battalion The Yorkshire Regiment (Green Howards), aged 25 from Whitby, Sunday 17 February 2008, in Helmand Province, southern Afghanistan. Shortly before 2100 hours local time Corporal Lawrence was taking part in a joint UK–Afghan National Army night patrol in Kajaki, tasked with clearing a number of compounds. Immediately upon entry into a compound an explosive device detonated fatally injuring Corporal Lawrence. Another soldier was also wounded, but his injuries were not life-threatening. Corporal Lawrence was later posthumously "Mentioned in Dispatches" for his actions.Operational Honours and Awards List: 25 July 2008

Corporal Damian Mulvihill, 40 Commando Royal Marines, aged 32 from Plymouth. Shortly before 1215 hrs local time on 20 February 2008 Corporal Mulvihill was taking part in a joint ISAF – ANA patrol engaged in operations near Sangin. The marines of Alpha Company were conducting a clearance patrol to deter Taliban intimidation of local Afghans. It was during this action that an Improvised Explosive Device was detonated, which killed Corporal Mulvihill instantly. Corporal Damian Mulvihill killed in Afghanistan

==== March 2008 ====
Lieutenant John Thornton, aged 22, and Marine David Marsh, aged 23, both of 40 Commando Royal Marines. Just after 1653 hours local time on Sunday 30 March 2008, the Marines were conducting a patrol in the vicinity of Kajaki, Helmand province, when the vehicle they were travelling in was caught in an explosion. Medical treatment was provided prior to both being evacuated to the field hospital at Camp Bastion. Despite the best efforts of the medical team, both died as a result of their wounds.

==== April 2008 ====
Senior Aircraftman Gary Thompson, aged 51, of No 504 (County of Nottingham) Squadron the Royal Auxiliary Air Force, and Senior Aircraftman Graham Livingstone, aged 23, who served with No 3 Squadron the RAF Regiment, were both killed by a roadside bomb while on patrol in Kandahar. Consensus on the airfield was that the enemy had laid the IED behind the outgoing patrol, and the vehicle returned to the perimeter along the same route, triggering the explosion. Senior Aircraftman Thompson is the oldest British serviceman to have died in Afghanistan.

Trooper Robert Pearson, aged 22, of the Queen's Royal Lancers. At approximately 0900hrs local time on Monday 21 April 2008 Trooper Pearson was part of the Armoured Support Company Royal Marines who were providing security to a resupply convoy that was returning to Camp Bastion when the vehicle he was driving hit a suspected mine. Another soldier was injured in the blast and received medical treatment.

==== May 2008 ====
Trooper Ratu Babakobau, aged 29, of the Household Cavalry Regiment was killed Friday 2 May 2008 in Helmand, Afghanistan at 1350hrs local time while providing protection for a routine patrol in the Nowzad area of northern Helmand. The vehicle he was travelling in suffered a minestrike. Three other British soldiers and one local national were also injured in the incident. Trooper Ratu Sakeasi Babakobau of the Household Cavalry Regiment killed in Helmand

James Thompson a soldier in the SAS (Reserve) died in an explosion in Afghanistan, Monday 19 May 2008. The soldier was patrolling on foot in Musa Qala, Helmand, when he was caught in an explosion and died. No one else was injured.

Marine Dale Gostick, of 3 Troop Armoured Support Company, Royal Marines was killed in action at the Sangin crossing of the Helmand River, southern Helmand province, Afghanistan, Sunday 25 May 2008. His troop were returning to their Forward Operating Base, when the BvS 10 Viking he was driving struck a suspected mine. Another two Royal Marines were also injured in the blast and received medical treatment.Marine Dale Gostick killed in Afghanistan

==== June 2008 ====
Private Nathan Cuthbertson, Private Daniel Gamble and Private Charles Murray of 2nd Battalion The Parachute Regiment died on Sunday 8 June 2008 in Helmand Province, Afghanistan. At approximately 1100 hours local time, the soldiers were on a routine foot patrol 1 km west of their Forward Operating Base in the Upper Sangin Valley when their patrol suffered a suicide explosive device. Their deaths brought the total number of British forces who have died in Afghanistan to 100.

Lance Corporal James Bateman and Private Jeff Doherty of 2nd Battalion The Parachute Regiment (2 Para) both died on Thursday 12 June 2008 in Helmand Province, Afghanistan. Early on 12 June 2008, 8 Platoon of C (Bruneval) Company, 2nd Battalion, the Parachute Regiment was engaged by the Taliban north of their base at FOB GIBRALTAR in the Upper Gereshk Valley, Helmand Province. During the exchange of fire Lance Corporal James Bateman and Private Jeff Doherty were killed in the face of the enemy amongst their colleagues and friends. One other soldier received wounds which required medical attention.

Corporal Sarah Bryant of the Intelligence Corps, Corporal Sean Robert Reeve of the Royal Signals, Lance Corporal Richard Larkin and Trooper Paul Stout of the Special Air Service reserves were killed in a roadside bomb incident approximately 10 km East of Lashkar Gah, Helmand Province at 1540hrs on Tuesday 17 June 2008. All four soldiers were killed while taking part in a deliberate operation east of Lashkar Gah when the Snatch Land Rover in which they were travelling was caught in an explosion. Another soldier was wounded in the incident and received treatment for his wounds at the UK Field Hospital at Camp Bastion. Corporal Sarah Bryant is the first woman soldier to be killed in the current operations in Afghanistan.

Warrant Officer Class 2 Michael Williams of 2nd Battalion The Parachute Regiment (2 PARA) was killed Tuesday 24 June 2008 during a firefight. He was commanding C (Bruneval) Company's Fire Support Group while the company was on a deliberate operation against the Taliban in the Upper Sangin Valley when he was fatally wounded.

Private Joe Whittaker, a reserve soldier who was attached to 2nd Battalion The Parachute Regiment, was killed Tuesday 24 June 2008 by a suspected Improvised Explosive Device. Private Whittaker was part of a mine detection team and was killed helping to ensure that large vehicle resupply convoys could reach Forward Operating Bases.

Warrant Officer Class 2 Dan Shirley of 13 Air Assault Support Regiment, Royal Logistics Corps was killed while on a Logistic Patrol from Sangin to Camp Bastion when the vehicle he was travelling in rolled over on Friday 27 June 2008.

Lance Corporal James "Jimmy" Johnson, B Company, 5th Battalion The Royal Regiment of Scotland was killed on Saturday 28 June 2008. LCpl Johnson was part of a vehicle checkpoint patrol operating in the Lashkar Gar area, when he was killed by an anti-personnel mine.

==== July 2008 ====
Corporal Jason Stuart Barnes, aged 25, from the Royal Electrical and Mechanical Engineers, attached to 2nd Battalion The Parachute Regiment, was killed in Afghanistan, Tuesday 22 July 2008. The incident occurred at 1818 hrs local time. Corporal Barnes was driving a Vector ambulance vehicle when it hit a suspected Improvised Explosive Device. He was returning to base after he had successfully aided in the helicopter evacuation of a casualty who had been injured earlier near Kajaki in northern Helmand.

Lance Corporal Kenneth Michael Rowe, aged 24, of the Royal Army Veterinary Corps, attached to 2nd Battalion the Parachute Regiment, died on Thursday 24 July 2008 on a routine patrol from Forward Operating Base Inkerman in the Sangin area of Helmand Province when the patrol came under enemy fire. Five other soldiers were injured by small arms fire. His explosives sniffer dog, Sasha, was also killed in the incident.

Sergeant Jonathan William Mathews, aged 35, from 4th Battalion The Royal Regiment of Scotland, attached to 1st Battalion The Royal Irish Regiment, was killed in Helmand province 28 July 2008. At 1006hrs local time, a joint Afghan National Army and UK Operational Mentoring Liaison Team were patrolling on foot in the Marjah area, west of Lashkar Gah, in Helmand province. The patrol received reports from locals that the Taliban were in the area but before they could take up defensive positions they received incoming fire, and the soldier sustained a single gunshot wound.

Private Peter Joe Cowton, aged 25, from 2nd Battalion The Parachute Regiment, was killed in Helmand province, Tuesday 29 July 2008. At 0600hrs local time, a routine patrol conducting reassurance and interdiction activities left Forward Operating Base (FOB) Gibraltar and at 0847hrs local time encountered enemy forces and engaged them. A short while later the patrol reported one casualty from the engagement who was seriously wounded by a blast, the soldier died shortly afterwards.

==== August 2008 ====
Signaller Wayne Bland, aged 21 from Leeds, serving with 16 Signal Regiment was killed in a suicide attack on a vehicle patrol in Kabul, Afghanistan, 11 August 2008. At 16.00hrs local time a suicide attacker rammed his vehicle into the patrol and detonated an explosive device causing a number of civilian casualties and injuring three British soldiers who were evacuated to a military hospital, however Signaller Bland later died from his wounds.

Corporal Barry Dempsey, aged 29, from The Royal Highland Fusiliers, 2nd Battalion the Royal Regiment of Scotland, attached to 1st Battalion the Royal Irish Regiment, was killed in an IED blast, Monday 18 August 2008. At 8.25am local time, a joint Afghan National Army and UK Operational Mentoring Liaison Team were patrolling, when they dismounted in the region of Forward Operating Base Attal, in the Gereshk area of Helmand Province. During that time an improvised explosive device was detonated which resulted in the death of Cpl Dempsey and shrapnel and blast injuries to one other ISAF soldier, an Afghan National Army soldier and the patrol interpreter.

==== September 2008 ====
Ranger Justin James "Cups" Cupples, aged 29, from 7 Platoon, C (Ranger) Company, 1st Battalion The Royal Irish Regiment, was killed in an explosion while on a foot patrol in Sangin town, northern Helmand Province at 0710 hours local time on Thursday 4 September 2008. The explosion is believed to have been from an improvised explosive device. The soldier was given first aid at the scene, but died a short time later

Warrant Officer Class 2 Gary "Gaz" O'Donnell GM, aged 40, an Ammunition Technician serving with 11 Explosive Ordnance Disposal Regiment, Royal Logistic Corps died 10 September 2008 in Musa Qaleh, Helmand province, southern Afghanistan. WO2 O'Donnell was commanding an Improvised Explosive Device Disposal team who were trying to make safe a confirmed IED that had been detected by a specialist search team. As a consequence of this there was an explosion and WO2 O'Donnell died shortly afterwards from the injuries he sustained in the explosion.

Private Jason Lee "Suspect" Rawstron, aged 23, who was serving with C ( Bruneval ) Company, 2nd Battalion, The Parachute Regiment died instantly after suffering a gunshot wound to the head during a firefight with Taliban near FOB Gibraltar, in the town of Sangin on 12 September.

Lance Corporal Nicky Mason, aged 26, from X Company, 2nd Battalion The Parachute Regiment, was killed by an explosion while on a routine patrol North West of FOB ZEBRUGGE, near Kajaki, Helmand province, on Saturday 13 September 2008. The patrol was clearing an area essential for the security of the Kajaki hydroelectric dam when LCpl Mason was struck by an improvised explosive device.

==== October 2008 ====
Trooper James "Magpie" Munday, aged 21, from 1 Troop, D Squadron, the Household Cavalry Regiment was killed by an explosion, 15 October 2008. Tpr Munday was driving a Jackal (MWMIK) wheeled reconnaissance vehicle on a routine patrol approximately 23 km north of Forward Operating Base Delhi in Helmand province, Afghanistan when it detonated a contact triggered explosive device. Two other soldiers were also injured.

==== November 2008 ====
Rifleman Yubraj Rai of the 2nd Battalion The Royal Gurkha Rifles was killed in Afghanistan on 4 November 2008 while taking part in a joint International Security Assistance Force and Afghan National Security Forces operation against enemy forces south of Musa Qaleh. Rifleman Rai received a gunshot wound from enemy fire. Despite having received medical treatment at the scene he died a short time later from his wounds.

Marine Neil Dunstan and Marine Robert "Frank" Joseph McKibben were killed in southern Helmand on Wednesday 12 November 2008 1647 hrs local time. The Marines were from the UK Landing Force Command Support Group, operating as part of Task Force Helmand's Information Exploitation Group. They were taking part in a patrol with soldiers from the Afghan Security Forces when their Jackal (MWMIK) vehicle was destroyed by an explosive device, both men were pronounced dead at the scene. A member of the Afghan National Security Forces also lost his life and a third Royal Marine was seriously injured.

Colour Sergeant Krishnabahadur Dura, aged 36, from the 2nd Battalion the Royal Ghurkha Rifles, was killed in the Musa Qala District of Helmand Province on Saturday 15 November 2008. Colour Sergeant Dura was taking part in a road move when the Warrior tracked armoured vehicle he was travelling in was hit by an improvised explosive device.

Marine Alexander Lucas, aged 24, of Victor Company, 45 Commando Royal Marines was killed as a result of an explosion in the Kajaki area of Helmand province on Monday 24 November 2008. He was taking part in a patrol alongside Afghan National Army troops to clear Improvised Explosive Devices. He received medical treatment at the scene; however he died of his wounds while being taken to the military hospital at Camp Bastion.

Marine Tony Evans, aged 20, and Marine Georgie Sparks, aged 19, both of J Company, 42 Commando Royal Marines, were killed in action northwest of Lashkar Gah in Helmand province at around 0900 hours on Thursday 27 November 2008. The two Marines were taking part in a foot patrol and had moved on to the roof of a compound when there was an attack by insurgents armed with rocket-propelled grenades and they were badly wounded. Both marines received immediate medical attention and were moved to a secure location before being put on a helicopter to be transferred back to Camp Bastion, however both died from their injuries during the flight.

==== December 2008 ====
Lance Corporal Steven "Jamie" Fellows, aged 26, of 1 Troop Whiskey Company, 45 Commando Group Royal Marines was killed shortly before 0900hrs on in action on Friday 12 December 2008 in Sangin, Helmand Province, Afghanistan. L/Cpl Fellows was travelling in the commanders position in a Jackal (MWMIK) when it was struck by an Improvised Explosive Device. Despite rapid evacuation to Forward Operating Base Jackson's medical facility and subsequent helicopter evacuation L/Cpl Fellows failed to regain consciousness and was subsequently pronounced dead.

Marine Damian Jonathan Davies, aged 27, Landing Force Support Party, Commando Logistic Regiment, Sergeant John "Manny" Manuel, aged 38, of Company HQ, X-Ray Company, 45 Commando Royal Marines and Corporal Marc "Birchy" Birch, aged 26, of 6 Troop, X-Ray Company Royal Marines were killed in action as a result of a bomb attack south of Sangin, Afghanistan on 12 December 2008. X-Ray Company was conducting an operation alongside Afghan National Army troops to dominate areas posing a dangerous threat to British forces and the local Afghan population. The men who were killed were members of the Quick Reaction Force (QRF) which was working in support of the company operation. The members of the QRF were talking to locals when a 13-year-old boy pushed a wheelbarrow containing an explosive device toward them, which was then detonated killing the marines and killing and injuring a number of children and civilians. It is thought that the boy did not know about the explosives in the wheelbarrow and was an unsuspecting victim of the blast.

Lieutenant Aaron Lewis, aged 26, from 29 Commando Regiment Royal Artillery was killed as a result of enemy fire on Monday 15 December 2008. He was at a Forward Operating Base in the Gereshk area of Helmand province when he was fatally wounded when the gun position he was commanding came under attack. He received immediate medical treatment and was then taken by helicopter to the International Security Assistance Force's military hospital at Kandahar, but died shortly after arrival.

Rifleman Stuart "Oz" Nash, aged 21, from 1st Battalion The Rifles was killed by enemy gunfire in Zarghun Kalay, Nad e Ali District, Helmand Province, Wednesday 17 December 2008. Rifleman Nash was covering his comrades from the roof-top of a building in a compound when he was wounded. He was treated on the scene and then flown to Camp Bastion for further treatment, but died from his injuries.

Corporal Robert Deering, aged 33, from the Commando Logistic Regiment Royal Marines was killed in Afghanistan on Sunday, 21 December 2008. At about 0715 hours, just west of Lashkar Gah in Helmand Province, a BvS 10 Viking armoured personnel carrier was disabled by an explosion which injured 3 personnel on board. When Cpl Deering, who was a Viking Mechanic, approached the disabled vehicle to assess the damage, there was a second explosion which killed him instantly.

Lance Corporal Benjamin "Ben" Whatley, aged 20, from Lima Company, 42 Commando Royal Marines, was killed in Afghanistan on 24 December 2008. Lima Company was conducting an operation to clear enemy forces from the north of the district of Nad-E-Ali when a fierce and prolonged fire fight occurred during which L/Cpl Whatley was fatally wounded.

Corporal Liam Elms, aged 26, from Zulu Company, 45 Commando, Royal Marines was killed by an explosion while taking part in a local area patrol alongside Afghan National Army troops on the afternoon of 31 December 2008 in the Sangin district, Helmand province, Afghanistan.

=== January 2009 to December 2009 ===
==== January 2009 ====
Serjeant Chris Reed, aged 25, of 6th (TA) Battalion The Rifles died in an explosion on New Year's Day in the Garmsir district of Helmand province. Serjeant Reed was attached to the Operational Mentoring and Liaison Team of C Company of the 1st Battalion The Rifles. He was 2IC of a section taking part in a vehicle patrol alongside members of the Afghan National Army when his vehicle was struck by an improvised explosive device.

Marine Travis Mackin, aged 22, from the Communications Squadron, United Kingdom Landing Force Command Support Group, operating as part of 45 Commando Royal Marines was killed as a result of an explosion on the morning of 11 January 2009 in the Kajaki area of Helmand province. Victor Company 45 Commando was conducting a deliberate offensive patrol alongside the Afghan National Army to destroy a key Taliban command cell. While establishing a vital fire-support location to protect his colleagues advancing on a Taliban defensive position, Mne Mackin was killed by an enemy Improvised Explosive Device. His death was represented on the Sky Television show Ross Kemp: Return to Afghanistan

Captain Tom Sawyer, aged 26, 29 Commando Regiment Royal Artillery, and Corporal Danny Winter, aged 28 and from Zulu Company 45 Commando Royal Marines, were killed by an explosion on 14 January 2009. Both men were taking part in a joint operation with a Danish Battle Group and the Afghan National Army in a location north east of Gereshk in central Helmand Provence. The MoD subsequently confirmed that the men died as a result of a 'Blue on Blue (Friendly fire)' incident, thought to involve a Javelin missile.

Rifleman (Acting Corporal) Richard "Robbo" Robinson, from 1st Battalion The Rifles was killed in Helmand province on Saturday, 17 January 2009. He was 21 years old and from Saltash, Cornwall. Acting Corporal Robinson was on a patrol to dominate ground with his Operational Mentoring and Liaison Team and the Afghan National Army platoon with whom he had been operating since September 2008 when he was killed as a result of enemy fire during an ambush north of Sangin District Centre.

Corporal Daniel "Danny" Nield, from "S" Company, 1st Battalion, The Rifles, was killed during combat, possibly by friendly fire, on Friday 30 January 2009. He was 31 years old. Corporal Nield died from injuries sustained from an explosion, believed to have been caused by an RPG, possibly fired by an Afghan National Army soldier, during a fire-fight while on a deliberate operation involving a joint UK and Afghan National Army patrol north of Musa Qala. He was operating as the Forward Air Controller in a Fire Support Team of 29 Commando Regiment Royal Artillery which was providing support to the operation.

==== February 2009 ====
Marine Darren Smith, aged 28, from X-ray Company, 45 Commando was killed Saturday 14 February 2009. The marine died as a result of wounds sustained from enemy fire in an area to the south west of Sangin, in Northern Helmand. He was part of a patrol operating in support of an Explosive Ordnance Disposal Team. The Patrol was ambushed by Taliban fighters and Marine Smith was struck by small-arms fire, however despite receiving medical help from his colleagues he died of his wounds while being flown to hospital.

Lance Corporal Stephen Kingscott, from 1st Battalion The Rifles was killed in Helmand province on 16 February 2009, he was 22 years old. L/Cpl Kingscott died from wounds sustained as a result of enemy fire during a joint UK and Afghan National Army assault of an enemy position during a deliberate operation against insurgents in the Nawa district of Helmand province.

Rifleman Jamie Gunn, aged 21, Corporal Tom Gaden and Lance Corporal Paul Upton, all of 1st Battalion The Rifles, were killed in southern Afghanistan 25 February 2009. The soldiers died from wounds sustained as a result of their Snatch Land Rover being struck by an enemy IED during an escort operation in the Gereshk district of Helmand province.

Marine Michael Laski, aged 21, from the Signals Detachment, Yankee Company, 45 Commando Royal Marines died peacefully in Selly Oak Hospital, Birmingham, UK on 25 February 2009 of wounds sustained from enemy fire while on a reassurance patrol in near Sangin in Northern Helmand on Monday 23 February. Marine Laski was taking part in a foot patrol to provide security to the local Afghan community. When crossing open ground they were engaged by enemy fire and during the engagement that followed Marine Laski was struck by a bullet. Despite the best efforts of all involved he failed to recover consciousness and died with his family round him.

==== March 2009 ====
Lance Corporal Christopher Harkett, aged 22, from C Company, The 2nd Battalion, Royal Welsh Regiment (The Royal Regiment of Wales) died on the morning of Saturday 14 March 2009 as a result of wounds sustained from an explosion while conducting a foot patrol south of Musa Qala District Centre, Northern Helmand. He received immediate medical attention from the medics within his team but died at the scene. He was the 150th British soldier to die in the current conflict in Afghanistan.

Corporal Graeme Stiff, aged 24, and Corporal Dean John, aged 25, both from the Royal Electrical and Mechanical Engineers, serving with the Light Aid Detachment, 1st The Queen's Dragoon Guards, died during the afternoon of Sunday 15 March 2009, as a result of an enemy explosion. The men were involved in a vehicle movement to the west of Garmsir in Helmand province, southern Afghanistan when the Jackal (MWMIK) they were travelling in was struck by an explosive device and destroyed, killing both men.

==== April 2009 ====
Lance Sergeant Tobie "Fas" Fasfous, aged 29, from the 1st Battalion Welsh Guards was killed in southern Afghanistan, Tuesday 28 April 2009. Lance Sergeant Fasfous was killed instantly as a result of an explosion while taking part in a foot patrol alongside the Afghan National Army in the vicinity of FOB Keenan, north east of Gereshk in Helmand province.

==== May 2009 ====
Corporal Sean Binnie from The Black Watch, 3rd Battalion The Royal Regiment of Scotland was killed as a result of a gunshot wound, Thursday 7 May 2009. Corporal Binnie was killed during a fire-fight with insurgents which occurred during reassurance patrol with the Afghan National Army in the vicinity of Woqab, close to Musa Qal'eh in Helmand Province.

Corporal Kumar Purja Pun, aged 30, from 1st Battalion The Royal Gurkha Rifles and Sergeant Ben Ross aged 34, of 173 Provost Company, 3rd Regiment, Royal Military Police, were killed in Afghanistan. The two Service personnel were killed by a suicide bomber during a patrol in Gereshk, Helmand province, in the afternoon of Thursday 7 May 2009. The men had dismounted from their Snatch Vixen Land Rover when they were approached by the bomber on a motorbike, who then immediately detonated his device. 21 Afghan civilians were also killed and 3 other soldiers and 30 Afghans injured.

Rifleman Adrian Sheldon from 2nd Battalion The Rifles was killed in Helmand province during the evening of Thursday 7 May 2009. He was travelling in a Jackal (MWMIK) near Sangin when it was struck by an explosive device.

Lieutenant Mark Evison, aged 26, from the 1st Battalion Welsh Guards died peacefully on 12 May 2009 in Selly Oak Hospital, Birmingham, as a result of a gunshot wound sustained during a patrol in the vicinity of Haji Halem, Helmand province, Afghanistan, on 9 May 2009. His family were with him when he died.

Marine Jason Mackie, aged 21, member of the Armoured Support Group Royal Marines, was killed in Afghanistan on 14 May 2009. He was located in the Basharan area of central Helmand, Afghanistan when the BvS 10 Viking he was driving in support of IX Company of the Welsh struck a device. The resulting explosion killed Marine Mackie instantly and seriously injured his crewman.

Fusilier Petero "Pat" Suesue of the 2nd Battalion The Royal Regiment of Fusiliers, was killed in Afghanistan on Friday 22 May 2009. While on a foot patrol near Sangin in Helmand Province Fusilier Suesue was fatally injured by a gunshot. Fusilier Suesue was 28 years old and originally from Fiji.

Sapper Jordan Rossi, aged 22, of 25 Field Squadron, 38 Engineer Regiment, was killed by an explosion on Saturday 23 May 2009. Sapper Rossi was part of a Royal Engineers Search Team embedded in the Joint Force Explosive Ordnance Disposal Group and was working in an operation to clear IEDs that were posing a lethal threat to British Forces and the local Afghan population.

Lance Corporal Robert Martin Richards from Armoured Support Group, Royal Marines died in Selly Oak Hospital on Wednesday 27 May 2009, from wounds sustained in Afghanistan five days previously. Lance Corporal Richards was 2IC of a Viking when it struck an IED in the Nad e-Ali district of central Helmand on 22 May 2009.

Lance Corporal Kieron Hill, aged 20, from 2nd Battalion The Mercian Regiment (Worcesters and Foresters) was killed on 28 May 2009. Lance Corporal Hill was on a deliberate operation near Garmsir in Helmand province when there was an explosion which killed him instantly.

Corporal Stephen Bolger, aged 28, from the Parachute Regiment, Lance Corporal Nigel Moffett from The Light Dragoons were both killed in Afghanistan on Saturday 30 May 2009. The UK MOD has officially said that both soldiers were serving with the Brigade Reconnaissance Force (although other reports suggest Corporal Bolger is actually part of the Special Forces Support Group). The soldiers were travelling in a Jackal (MWMIK) on an operation near Musa Qaleh when they were killed as a result of an explosion.

==== June 2009 ====
Rifleman Cyrus Thatcher, aged 19, from 2nd Battalion The Rifles, was killed in Helmand province, Tuesday 2 June 2009. The soldier was on a patrol near Gereshk, when he was killed by an explosion.

Private Robert McLaren, from the Black Watch, 3rd Battalion the Royal Regiment of Scotland, was killed near Kandahar on 11 June 2009 during a deliberate operation against insurgent fighters. When his section became pinned down by accurate rifle fire from two sides Pte McLaren pushed forward to obtain a better fire position to relieve his section, but was killed by an explosion from an improvised explosive device.

Lieutenant Paul Mervis, a platoon commander from The 2nd Battalion the Rifles was on a foot patrol near Sangin, northern Helmand Province, when he was killed as a result of an explosion from an improvised explosive device, on the morning of 12 June 2009.

Major Sean Birchall, aged 33, from the 1st Battalion Welsh Guards, was killed by an explosion on 19 June 2009 near Lashkar Gah, in Helmand province. Major Birchall was travelling in a Jackal (MWMIK) which was the second vehicle in a group of three which were involved in a routine patrol to deliver supplies and check on his men in the checkpoints around Basharan. Although he survived the initial blast and received immediate medical attention at the scene, Major Birchall died of his injuries before he could be extracted to medical facilities.

==== July 2009 ====
Lieutenant Colonel Rupert Thorneloe MBE, aged 39, commanding officer of the 1st Battalion Welsh Guards, and Trooper Joshua Hammond, who was 18 years old, of 2nd Royal Tank Regiment, died Wednesday 1 July 2009, after their BvS 10 Viking was destroyed in an explosion while the men were engaged in Operation Panchai Palang and were part of a resupply convoy heading toward troops in Babaji, north of Lashkar Gah, in Helmand Provence. Another six troops were injured by the blast. Lt Col Thorneloe is the highest ranking British Army officer to be killed in action since the Falklands War in 1982.

Private Robert "Robbie" Laws, aged 18, and from 2nd Battalion The Mercian Regiment (Worcesters and Foresters) died when the FV103 Spartan armoured personnel carrier he was travelling in was struck by a rocket-propelled grenade (RPG) while taking part in operation Panchai Palang on Saturday 4 July 2009. Pte Laws had been involved in a dismounted IED search team and had periodically been dismounting and remounting the vehicle as it stopped and started along a road. It was immediately after he had remounted and the vehicle had just moved off when it was struck.

Lance Corporal David Dennis from Command Troop, The Light Dragoons was killed by an improvised explosive device while on foot patrol as part of operation Panchai Palang on Saturday 4 July 2009. He was aged 29. L/Cpl Dennis had just been involved in the evacuation of soldiers who were wounded in the RPG attack that had killed Pvt Laws and was returning to his vehicle when he stepped on an IED causing it to detonate. Several other members of the patrol were injured in the explosion.

Lance Corporal Dane Elson, aged 22, serving with the Welsh Guards (Attached to B Company, 2nd Battalion The Mercian Regiment), was killed in Afghanistan on Sunday 5 July 2009. L/Cpl Elson was killed instantly by an improvised explosive device while on patrol in Babaji as part of Operation Panchai Palang.

Captain Ben Babington-Browne, aged 27, from 22 Engineer Regiment, Royal Engineers, died in an incident in Afghanistan, Monday 6 July 2009 when the helicopter he was in crashed while taking off from a US forward operating base in Zabul province. Two Canadian personnel, later named as Master Corporal Pat Audet and Corporal Martin Joannette, were also killed in the incident. It was "determined that the crash did not occur as a result of enemy fire".

Trooper Christopher "Norm" Whiteside, aged 22, from Emsdorf Troop The Light Dragoons, died on Tuesday 7 July 2009 as a result of an IED explosion near Gereshk in Helmand Province while taking part in Operation Panchai Palang.

Rifleman Daniel Hume, aged 22, of the 4th Battalion The Rifles, was killed by a contact explosion while on a foot patrol near Nad e-Ali, Helmand province on 9 July 2009.

Private John Brackpool, aged 27, formally of The Princess of Wales's Royal Regiment and serving as a reservist with the 1st Battalion Welsh Guards, died on 9 July 2009 as a result of a gunshot wound. He was shot and killed while he was on sentry duty on a compound that had recently been secured as part of Operation Panchai Palang, near Char-e-Anjir, just outside Lashkar Gah, in Helmand Province.

Corporal Lee "Scotty" Scott from EGYPT Squadron, 2nd Royal Tank Regiment was killed in Afghanistan on 10 July 2009 near Nad Ali, Helmand province while taking part in Operation Panchai Palang. He died in an explosion as he was travelling in the lead vehicle of a group of BvS 10 Vikings.

On 10 July 2009, Corporal Jonathan Horne, aged 28, from Walsall, Rifleman William Aldridge, aged 18 from Bromyard in Herefordshire, Rifleman James Backhouse, aged 18 from Castleford, Yorkshire, Rifleman Joe Murphy, aged 18 from Castle Bromwich, Birmingham, Rifleman Daniel Simpson, aged 20 from Croydon, all from 9 Platoon, C Company, 2nd Battalion The Rifles were killed in two separate blasts on the same patrol near Sangin, Helmand province. The men were conducting a routine patrol from FOB Wishtan when at approximately 0520 hrs a member of the patrol accidentally detonated an improvised explosive device (IED) which fatally wounded him and injured seven other members of the patrol. The soldiers then recovered their wounded and dropped back to attend to them and await the assistance of the medical Quick Reaction Force (QRF). At approximately 0530 hours, just as the QRF arrived, a second, more powerful device was detonated in the area where the wounded men were being treated, killing another three members of the platoon including Rifleman Murphy who was carrying his close friend Rifleman Simpson, to safety after he had been wounded in the first explosion. Attempts to evacuate the injured soldiers were further hampered by IEDs on the possible helicopter landing areas at the scene of the explosion so the men had to be evacuated to the FOB, however more IEDs had been placed by the Taliban on the route back to FOB Wishtan. The wounded men were finally extracted by a Royal Air Force Chinook and US Pave Hawk which landed inside FOB Wishtan, however another soldier died from his wounds as he underwent surgery at Camp Bastion.

Rifleman Aminiasi Toge, aged 26, from "C" Company, 2nd Battalion The Rifles was killed by an explosion, thought to be from an IED while on a foot patrol near Gereshk, Helmand province, 16 July 2009.

Corporal Joseph "Etch" Etchells, from The 2nd Battalion Royal Regiment of Fusiliers was killed in Afghanistan on 19 July 2009. Cpl Etchells, who was aged 22 and from Mossley, Greater Manchester, was killed as a result of an explosion that happened while on a foot patrol near Sangin, northern Helmand Province.

Captain Daniel Shepherd, from 11 Explosive Ordnance Disposal Regiment, The Royal Logistic Corps, was killed on 20 July 2009. He was killed as a result of an explosion while on patrol in Nad-e-Ali District, Helmand Province. At the time of his death he was commanding an Improvised Explosive Device Disposal team, assigned to the Joint Force Explosive Ordnance Disposal Group, who were defusing confirmed IEDs.

Guardsman Christopher King, from the 1st Battalion Coldstream Guards, who had been attached to the Number 2 Company, 1st Battalion Welsh Guards since late 2008, was killed on 22 July 2009, as a result of an explosion while on a dismounted patrol in Nad Ali District, Helmand Province.

Bombardier Craig "Hoppo" Hopson, from 40th Regiment Royal Artillery (The Lowland Gunners), attached to The Black Watch, 3rd Battalion The Royal Regiment of Scotland, was killed in Afghanistan, 25 July 2009. While taking part in Operation Panchai Palang, Bombardier Hopson was part of a patrol tasked to reconnoitre a suitable area for a polling station in the forthcoming Afghan presidential elections. During this patrol the Jackal (MWMIK) in which Bombardier Hopson was travelling struck a roadside bomb resulting in his death.

Trooper Phillip "Lenny" Lawrence, aged 22, serving with C Squadron The Light Dragoons, was killed Monday 27 July 2009 as a result of an explosion that happened while travelling in a FV107 Scimitar CVR(T) as part of a vehicle patrol ensuring the security of an area that had been cleared as part of Operation Panchai Palang, in Lashkar Gah District, central Helmand Province.

Warrant Officer Class 2 Sean Upton, aged 35, from Beeston, Nottinghamshire and a member of 5th Regiment, Royal Artillery, was killed as a result of an explosion that happened while on a foot patrol in Sangin District, Helmand Province, Monday 27 July 2009. WO2 Upton was serving in Afghanistan as 2IC of Sangin's Police Mentoring Team.

==== August 2009 ====
Craftsman Anthony Lombardi from the Royal Electrical and Mechanical Engineers, attached to the Light Dragoons, was killed in Afghanistan on the morning of Tuesday 4 August 2009. He was killed as a result of an explosion that happened while on a vehicle patrol in Babaji District, southern Helmand province.

Corporal Kevin Mulligan, Lance Corporal Dale Thomas Hopkins and Private Kyle Adams were killed in Afghanistan on Thursday 6 August 2009. All three men were from The Parachute Regiment and were serving with the Special Forces Support Group and were involved in training Afghan National Security Forces. They were on a routine patrol when their Jackal (MWMIK) was hit by an IED followed up by a small-arms attack. Another British soldier remains in a critical condition following the attack.

Private Jason George Williams from A (Grenadier) Company, 2nd Battalion The Mercian Regiment was killed in Afghanistan on Saturday 8 August 2009 by an explosion. Private Williams' platoon was attempting to recover the body of an Afghan National Army warrior who was killed earlier in the day, when an IED exploded killing Pte Williams.

Captain Mark Hale and Rifleman Daniel Wild of 2nd Battalion The Rifles and Lance Bombardier Matthew Hatton of 40th Regiment Royal Artillery (The Lowland Gunners) were killed in Afghanistan on Thursday 13 August 2009. Lance Bombardier Hatton had been clearing a route to a helicopter landing zone to enable an earlier casualty to be airlifted to medical aid when he was caught by an IED blast and was wounded. Captain Hale and Rifleman Wild then attempted to extract L/Bdr Hatton, but all three men were caught by another IED blast which resulted in their deaths.

Private Richard Hunt, aged 21, from 2nd Battalion The Royal Welsh died on Saturday 15 August 2009 from wounds sustained in Helmand province on 13 August 2009. Pvt Hunt was driving a FV510 Warrior when it was hit by an IED. As a result of this Pvt Hunt's head struck the vehicle and despite wearing his drivers protective helmet Pvt Hunt sustained a serious injury from which he never recovered consciousness. He was subsequently aero-medically evacuated to the Royal Centre for Defence Medicine in Selly Oak Hospital so his family could be with him when he died.

Sergeant Simon Valentine, aged 29, from Bedworth, and was platoon sergeant, 2 Platoon, A Company, 2nd Battalion The Royal Regiment of Fusiliers was killed in Afghanistan on Saturday 15 August 2009. Sgt Valentine was on foot patrol near Sangin when he was caught by the blast from an IED.

Lance Corporal James Fullarton, aged 24, Fusilier Simon Annis, aged 22, and Fusilier Louis Carter, aged 18, all of 2nd Battalion The Royal Regiment of Fusiliers were killed in Afghanistan on Sunday 16 August 2009. The three men were taking part in a foot patrol near Sangin in Helmand province when Lance Corporal James Fullarton, who was the Section Commander was badly hurt by a roadside bomb. Fusiliers Annis and Carter went to his assistance, but a second IED detonated, killing all three soldiers.

Serjeant Paul McAleese, of 2nd Battalion the Rifles, and Private Johnathon Young, of 3rd Battalion The Yorkshire Regiment (Duke of Wellington's), were killed in Afghanistan on Thursday 20 August 2009 while in Sangin district. The two soldiers were on foot patrol when Private Young was injured by the blast from an IED. As Serjeant McAleese attempted to assist Young there was a secondary explosion which fatally injured both men.

Fusilier Shaun Bush, aged 24, of the 2nd Battalion The Royal Regiment of Fusiliers died at the Royal Centre for Defence Medicine, Selly Oak, on Tuesday 25 August 2009. While on a foot patrol in Sangin district, Helmand province, on Saturday 15 August 2009 Fusilier Bush was attempting to rescue Sergeant Simon Valentine when there was a secondary explosion which seriously injured him. It was clear he would not recover from his injuries and he was evacuated to Selly Oak, where he died with his close family around him.

A Royal Marine died following an explosion while on a foot patrol near Gereshk in Helmand Province, Afghanistan, in the early hours of Saturday 29 August 2009. His family have asked for no further information to be released.

Sergeant Stuart "Gus" Millar, aged 40, and Private Kevin Elliott, aged 24, both from The Black Watch, 3rd Battalion The Royal Regiment of Scotland, were killed as a result of an RPG explosion that happened while on a foot patrol north of Lashkar Gah District, southern Helmand Province on Monday 31 August 2009.

==== September 2009 ====
Lance Corporal Richard James Brandon, operating with The Light Dragoons Battle Group, was killed as a result of an explosion that happened while on a vehicle move in the Babaji district, central Helmand province, on the evening of 2 September 2009.

Private Gavin Elliott from 2nd Battalion The Mercian Regiment, operating with The Light Dragoons Battle Group, died as a result of a gunshot wound he sustained while on a foot patrol in the Babaji district, central Helmand province, on Thursday 3 September 2009.

Corporal John Harrison from The Parachute Regiment was killed in Afghanistan on Wednesday 9 September 2009.

Kingsman Jason Dunn-Bridgeman from 2nd Battalion The Duke of Lancaster's Regiment was killed in a firefight with the enemy during a foot patrol in the Babaji district of Helmand province on 13 September 2009.

Trooper Brett Hall from the 2nd Royal Tank Regiment died at the Royal Centre for Defence Medicine, Selly Oak, on Wednesday 16 September 2009 of wounds sustained in Afghanistan.

Acting Serjeant Stuart McGrath, from 2nd Battalion The Rifles was killed as a result of an explosion that happened while on a foot patrol in the Gereshk district, central Helmand province, on the afternoon of 16 September 2009.

Acting Sergeant Michael Lockett MC, of 2nd Battalion the Mercian Regiment (Worcesters and Foresters) was killed in Afghanistan on Monday 21 September 2009.

Private James Prosser from 2nd Battalion The Royal Welsh was killed as a result of an explosion that happened during a vehicle patrol in Musa Qaleh district, northern Helmand province on 27 September 2009.

==== October 2009 ====
Acting Corporal Marcin Wojtak from 34 Squadron Royal Air Force Regiment was killed as a result of an explosion while commanding his vehicle in the desert to the south of Bastion Joint Operating Base on Thursday 1 October 2009.

Guardsman Jamie Janes from 1st Battalion Grenadier Guards, was killed as a result of an explosion that happened while on a foot patrol near to Nad e-Ali district centre in central Helmand province on Monday 5 October 2009.

Lance Corporal James Hill from 1st Battalion Coldstream Guards was killed as a result of an explosion near Camp Bastion in Helmand Province on Thursday 8 October 2009.

Corporal Thomas Mason from 3 SCOTS The Black Watch, wounded by an explosion while on foot patrol in Kandahar on 15 September 2009. Despite the best efforts of medical staff, both in theatre and back in the UK, over a period of nearly six weeks, he died as a result of his wounds on 25 October 2009 at The Royal Centre for Defense Medicine, Selly Oak Hospital.

Corporal Thomas Mason

Staff Sergeant Olaf Schmid GC from 11 Explosive Ordnance Disposal Regiment, Royal Logistic Corps, died in an explosion while trying to defuse a roadside bomb on 31 October 2009 near Sangin, in Helmand Province.

==== November 2009 ====
Note: Please add the correct ranks and titles to those fallen personnel below:

Sergeant Matthew Telford, Corporal Steven Boote (RMP), Guardsman Jimmy Major, Warrant Officer Class 1 (RSM) Darren Chant and Corporal Nicholas Webster-Smith (RMP) from 1st Battalion, The Grenadier Guards were all killed by an Afghan soldier who was posing as a police officer at Nadi-e-Ali in Helmand Province on 3 November 2009.

Serjeant Phillip Scott from 3rd Battalion, The Rifles was killed by an improvised explosive device at Sangin, Helmand Province on 5 November 2009.

Rifleman Philip Allen from 2nd Battalion, The Rifles was killed by an improvised explosive device at Sangin, Helmand Province on 7 November 2009.

Rifleman Samuel Bassett aged 20, from 4th Battalion, The Rifles died in hospital from injuries sustained in a blast at Sangin, Helmand Province on 8 November 2009.

Rifleman Andrew Fentiman from 7th Battalion, The Rifles was killed by enemy fire while on foot patrol at Sangin, Helmand Province on 15 November 2009.

Cpl Loren Marlton-Thomas from 33 Engineer Regiment was killed by an improvised explosive device in Gereshk, Helmand Province on 15 November 2009.

Sgt Robert Loughran-Dickson from the Royal Military Police died from gunshot wounds sustained on patrol in Nad-e-Ali in Helmand Province on 18 November 2009.

Acting Sgt John Amer from 1st Battalion, The Coldstream Guards died from wounds sustained in an explosion at Babaji, Helmand Province on 30 November 2009.

==== December 2009 ====
Lance Corporal Adam Drane from 1st Battalion, The Royal Anglian Regiment died as a result of small arms fire while guarding a checkpoint in the Nad-e-Ali area, in central Helmand province on 7 December 2009. On 8 December 2009, he was announced as the 100th British soldier to die in Afghanistan in the year 2009. This year had been the bloodiest for British forces since the Falklands War in 1982, and followed 39 British deaths in Afghanistan in 2006, 42 in 2007 and 51 in 2008. The number of British troops wounded in Afghanistan had doubled in a year: 432 servicemen and women injured so far in 2009—compared to 235 in all of 2008.

Corporal Simon Hornby, from 2nd Battalion, The Duke of Lancaster's Regiment, was caught in an explosion on foot patrol in Helmand on 20 December.

Lance Corporal David Kirkness and Rifleman James Brown both from the 3rd Battalion, The Rifles were killed by a suspected suicide bomber near Sangin in Helmand Province on Tuesday 15 December 2009. This raised UK fatalities since 2001 in this theatre to 239, 102 of these sustained in 2009.

On 23 December, an investigation was started to the deaths of Lance Corporal Michael David Pritchard, aged 22, a member of the Royal Military Police who was attached to 3rd Battalion The Rifles, and Lance Corporal Christopher Roney aged 23, from 3rd Battalion the Rifles, who possibly died as a result of friendly fire ("blue on blue"), the last one after a vicious firefight in Patrol Base Almas near Sangin in Helmand. This brought the number of British service personnel deaths in Afghanistan in 2009 to 106. There had been 243 British troops killed in Afghanistan since 2001.

On 28 December, Rfn Aidan Howell from 3rd Battalion The Rifles, died in an explosion while on patrol in the Kajaki area of Helmand province. This casualty brought the number of British soldiers killed in the conflict since 2001 to 244, including 107 in 2009.

On 31 December, Sapper David Watson from Royal Engineers, died in an explosion while on patrol in the Sangin area of Helmand province. This casualty brought the number of British soldiers killed in the conflict since 2001 to 245, including 108 in 2009.

==== Official number of casualties ====
On 15 December, the official casualty toll up to the end of November 2009 was released by the Ministry of Defence: more than 1,000 members of the Armed Forces had been wounded in action in Afghanistan since the mission began in late 2001. The vast majority of them was since 2006, when the campaign started in the southern Helmand province. One third of the wounded suffered serious or very serious injuries.

2009 was the worst year of the War in Afghanistan for the UK army with 95 soldiers killed in action.

In 2009 the total number of deaths had exceeded the landmark of 100 and nearly half of the 464 wounded in battle were injured since November 2008. The increase in injured service personnel had also been marked compared with previous years. In 2008, the total number wounded in action was 235. In 2006, when 16 Air Assault Brigade was sent to Helmand, 85 were wounded in action.

All the injured received initial treatment at the British military hospital at Camp Bastion in central Helmand, before being evacuated to Selly Oak Hospital in Birmingham. Wounded militaries requiring artificial limbs or rehabilitation for other injuries were then sent to the special defence medical facility at Headley Court, near Dorking, Surrey.

The British Prince William paid tribute in December 2009 to the Armed Forces at the annual military awards, organised by The Sun newspaper. In her yearly Christmas message, the British Queen Elizabeth paid tribute to the Armed Forces serving in Afghanistan. She expressed her sadness at the death toll and praised the stoicism showed by bereaved families of killed military personnel.

=== January 2010 to December 2010 ===
==== January 2010 ====
On 3 January, Private Robert Hayes, aged 19, from 1st Battalion The Royal Anglian Regiment was killed by a roadside bomb in Helmand.

On 11 January Captain Daniel Read, aged 31, from Royal Logistic Corps, 11 EOD Regiment was killed by an IED in Helmand.

On 15 January Corporal Lee Brownson, aged 30, from 3rd Battalion The Rifles was killed by an IED in Helmand.

On 15 January Rifleman Luke Famer, aged 19, from 3rd Battalion The Rifles was killed by an IED in Helmand.

On 22 January, the death of Rifleman Peter Aldridge, aged 19, of A Company, 4 Rifles, in a bomb explosion in Sangin, Helmand province while on foot patrol, brought the British death toll since the start of the Afghanistan war to 250. The number of British dead in the country then reached five short of the total who died in the Falklands war.

On 24 January, L/Cpl Daniel Cooper, aged 21, from 3rd Battalion The Rifles, died in an explosion while on patrol in the Sangin area of Helmand province.

==== February 2010 ====
On 1 February, Cpl Liam Riley, aged 21, from 3rd Battalion, The Yorkshire Regiment, died in an explosion while on patrol near Malgir in Helmand province.

On 1 February, L/Cpl Graham Shaw, aged 27, from 3rd Battalion, The Yorkshire Regiment, died in an explosion while on patrol near Malgir in Helmand province.

On 7 February, Pte Sean McDonald, aged 26, from 1st Battalion The Royal Regiment of Scotland, Royal Scots Borderers, died in an explosion while on patrol near Sangin in Helmand province.

On 7 February, Cpl John Moore, aged 22, from 1st Battalion The Royal Regiment of Scotland, Royal Scots Borderers, died in an explosion while on patrol near Sangin in Helmand province.

On 8 February, Warrant Officer Class 2 David Markland, aged 36, from 36 Engineer Regiment, died in an explosion while conducting route clearance operations in the Nad Ali area in Helmand province.

On 11 February, L/Cpl Darren Hicks, aged 29, from 1st Battalion The Coldstream Guards, died in an explosion while on patrol in Babaji in Helmand province.

On 13 February, L/Sgt Dave Greenhalgh, aged 25, from Grenadier Guards, 1st Battalion, died in an explosion while on patrol in the Nad Ali area in Helmand province.

On 14 February, Kingsman Sean Dawson, aged 19, from The Duke of Lancaster's Regiment, 2nd Battalion, died after being shot by Afghan forces in a friendly fire incident in Musa Qala in Helmand province.

On 14 February, Rifleman Mark Marshall, aged 29, from 6th Battalion The Rifles, 3 Rifles Battle Group, died in an explosion while on patrol in the north-east of Sangin in Helmand province.

On 15 February, Sapper Guy Mellors, aged 20, from 36 Engineer Regiment, died in an explosion while clearing roadside bombs north-east of Sangin in Helmand province.

On 18 February, Lt Douglas Dalzell, aged 27, from 1st Battalion The Coldstream Guards, died in an explosion while on patrol in Babaji in Helmand province.

On 18 February, L/Sgt David Walker, aged 36, from 1st Battalion Scots Guards, died in after being shot while on patrol in Nad Ali in Helmand province.

On 24 February, Senior Aircraftman Luke Southgate, aged 20, from 2 Squadron, Kandahar Airfield Defence Force, died in an explosion while on patrol North of Kandahar Airfield in Helmand province.

On 25 February, Rifleman Martin Kinggett, aged 19, from A Company 4 Rifles, 3 Rifles Battle Group, died in a shooting while on patrol near Sangin in Helmand province.

On 26 February, Sgt Paul Fox, aged 34, from 28 Engineer Regiment, attached to the Brigade Reconnaissance Force, died in an explosion while on patrol in Nad Ali in Helmand province.

==== March 2010 ====
On 1 March, Rfn Carlo Apolis, aged 28, from A Company, 4 Rifles, 3 Rifles Battle Group, died in a shooting while on patrol near Sangin in Helmand province.

On 2 March, Cpl Richard Green, aged 23, from 3rd Battalion, The Rifles, Recce Platoon, died in a shooting while manning a vehicle checkpoint near Sangin in Helmand province.

On 5 March, Rfn Jonathon Allott, aged 19, from 3rd Battalion, The Rifles, died in an explosion while on patrol in Sangin in Helmand province.

On 6 March, Rfn Liam Maughan, aged 18, from 3rd Battalion, The Rifles, died in a shooting while on patrol near Malgir in Helmand province.

On 7 March, Cpl Stephen Thompson, aged 31, from 1st Battalion, The Rifles, serving with 3rd Battalion, The Rifles Battle Group, died in an explosion while on patrol in the Sangin area in Helmand province.

On 7 March, L/Cpl Tom Keogh, aged 24, from A Company, 4th Battalion, The Rifles, part of the 3 Rifles Battle Group, died in a shooting while on patrol in the Sangin area in Helmand province.

On 15 March, Cpt Martin Driver, aged 31, from 1st Battalion, The Royal Anglian Regiment, serving with Household Cavalry Regiment Battle Group, died in an explosion while on patrol in the Musa Qala district in Helmand province.

On 16 March, L/Cpl Scott Hardy, aged 26, from 1st Battalion The Royal Anglian Regiment, serving with Household Cavalry Regiment Battle Group, died in an explosion while on patrol north of Musa Qala in Helmand province.

On 16 March, Pte James Grigg, aged 21, from 1st Battalion The Royal Anglian Regiment, serving with Household Cavalry Regiment Battle Group, died in an explosion while on patrol north of Musa Qala in Helmand province.

On 22 March, Sjt Steven Campbell, aged 30, from A Company, 3rd Battalion The Rifles, part of the 3 Rifles Battle Group, died in an explosion while on patrol in Sangin in Helmand province.

On 26 March, L/Cpl of Horse Jonathan Woodgate, aged 27, from Household Cavalry Regiment, died in an explosion while on patrol in the Sangin area in Helmand province.

On 27 March, Rfn Daniel Holkham, aged 19, from 3rd Battalion The Rifles, part of the 3 Rifles Battle Group, died in an explosion while on patrol in the Sangin area in Helmand province.

==== April 2010 ====
On 1 April, Guardsman Michael Sweeney, aged 19, from 1st Battalion The Coldstream Guards, died in an explosion while on patrol in Babaji in Helmand province.

On 4 April, Rfn Mark Turner, aged 20, from 3rd Battalion The Rifles, died in an explosion while on patrol near the Kajaki area in Helmand province.

On 7 April, Fusilier Jonathan Burgess, aged 21, from 1st Battalion The Royal Welsh, 3 Platoon, A Company, died in a shooting while on patrol near the Nad Ali area in Helmand province.

==== May 2010 ====
On 2 May, Cpl Harvey Alex Holmes, aged 22, from 1st Battalion, The Mercian Regiment serving with 40 Commando Royal Marines Battle Group, died in an explosion while on patrol near Sangin in Helmand province.

On 3 May, Sapper Daryn Roy, aged 28, from 21 Engineer Regiment, died in an explosion while on vehicle patrol in Nad Ali in Helmand province.

On 3 May, L/Cpl Barry Buxton, aged 27, from 21 Engineer Regiment, died after a road collapsed causing his vehicle to roll into a canal in Nad Ali in Helmand province.

On 9 May, Cpl Christopher Harrison, aged 26, from Bravo Company, 40 Commando, died in an explosion while on patrol in Sangin in Helmand province.

On 21 May, Cpl Stephen Walker, aged 42, from 40 Commando, died in an explosion while on patrol in Sangin in Helmand province.

On 26 May, Gunner Zak Cusack, aged 20, from 1st Battalion The Royal Gurkha Rifles, 4th Regiment Royal Artillery, died in a shooting while on patrol in Nahr-e Saraj in Helmand province.

On 26 May, Cpl Stephen Curley, aged 26, from 40 Commando, died in an explosion while on patrol near Sangin in Helmand province.

On 30 May, Marine Scott Taylor, aged 21, from Alpha Company, 40 Commando, died in an explosion while on patrol near Sangin in Helmand province.

==== June 2010 ====
On 2 June, Marine Anthony Hotine, aged 21, from Alpha Company, 40 Commando, died in an explosion while on patrol near Sangin in Helmand province.

On 4 June, L/Cpl Terry Webster, aged 24, from 1st Battalion, The Mercian Regiment, was shot and killed while on patrol in Nahr-e Saraj in Helmand province.

On 4 June, L/Cpl Alan Cochran, aged 23, from 1st Battalion, The Mercian Regiment, shot and killed while on patrol in Nahr-e Saraj in Helmand province.

On 8 June, Lance Bombardier Mark Chandler, aged 32, from Regiment Royal Horse Artillery, attached to 4th Regiment Royal Artillery, shot and killed while on patrol near Nad Ali in Helmand province.

On 9 June, Pte Jonathan Monk, from 2nd Battalion The Princess of Wales's Royal Regiment, Attached to 1st Battalion The Mercian Regiment, died in an explosion while on patrol in Nahr-e Saraj in Helmand province.

On 12 June, L/Cpl Andrew Breeze, aged 31, from 1st Battalion The Mercian Regiment, part of 1st Battalion The Royal Gurkha Rifles Battle Group, died in an explosion while on patrol in Nahr-e Saraj in Helmand province.

On 14 June, Marine James Steven Birdsall, aged 20, from Bravo Company, 40 Commando, died in hospital in the UK after being shot while on patrol near Sangin in Helmand province.

On 15 June, Cpl Taniela Rogoiruwai, aged 32, from 1st Battalion, The Duke of Lancaster's Regiment, was shot and killed while on patrol near Sangin in Helmand province.

On 15 June, Kingsman Ponipate Tagitaginimoce, aged 29, from 1st Battalion, The Duke of Lancaster's Regiment, was shot and killed while on patrol near Sangin in Helmand province.

On 18 June, Trooper Ashley David Smith, aged 21, from D Squadron, Viking Group, Royal Dragoon Guards, died in an explosion while on patrol near Sangin in Helmand province.

On 20 June, Marine Richard Hollington, aged 23, from Bravo Company, 40 Commando, died in a hospital in the UK by an explosion while on patrol near Sangin in Helmand province.

On 21 June, Marine Paul Warren, aged 23, from Charlie Company, 40 Commando, died in a blast by a grenade when his patrol base was attacked near Sangin in Helmand province.

On 22 June, L/Cpl Michael Taylor, aged 30, from Charlie Company, 40 Commando, shot and killed while on patrol near Sangin in Helmand province.

On 23 June, L/Cpl David Andrew Ramsden, aged 26, from 1st Battalion The Yorkshire Regiment, died in a vehicle accident with three other soldiers while on patrol in Nahr-e Saraj in Helmand province.

On 23 June, Pte Alex Isaac, aged 20, from 3rd Battalion, The Yorkshire Regiment, died in a vehicle accident with three other soldiers while on patrol in Nahr-e Saraj in Helmand province.

On 23 June, Colour Sgt Simon Martyn Horton, aged 34, from 1st Battalion The Mercian Regiment, died in a vehicle accident with three other soldiers while on patrol in Nahr-e Saraj in Helmand province.

On 23 June, Pte Douglas Niall Halliday, aged 20, from 1st Battalion, The Mercian Regiment, died in a vehicle accident with three other soldiers while on patrol in Nahr-e Saraj in Helmand province.

On 23 June, Sgt Steven William Darbyshire, aged 35, from Alpha Company, 40 Commando, was shot and killed while on patrol near Sangin in Helmand province.

On 26 June, Bombardier Stephen Raymond Gilbert, aged 36, from 4th Regiment, Royal Artillery, died in hospital in the UK due to an explosion while on patrol in Nahr-e Saraj in Helmand province.

On 27 June, Cpl Jamie Kirkpatrick, aged 32, from 101 Engineer Regiment, shot and killed while on patrol in Nahr-e Saraj in Helmand province.

==== July 2010 ====
On 1 July, Cpl Seth Stephens, aged 42, from Special Boat Service, Royal Marines, shot and killed while on patrol near Haji Wakil in Helmand province.

On 5 July, Pte Thomas Sephton, aged 20, from 1st Battalion, The Mercian Regiment, died in a hospital in the UK by an explosion while on patrol near Nahr-e Saraj in Helmand province.

On 5 July, Trooper James Leverett, aged 20, from D Squadron, Viking Group, Royal Dragoon Guards, died in an explosion while on patrol near Nahr-e Saraj in Helmand province.

On 8 July, Bombardier Samuel Robinson, aged 31, from 5th Regiment Royal Artillery, died in an explosion while on patrol near Sangin in Helmand province.

On 8 July, Marine David Charles Hart, aged 23, from 40 Commando, Royal Marines, died in an explosion while on patrol near Sangin in Helmand province.

On 13 July, Cpl Arjun Purja Pun, aged 33, from 1st Battalion, The Royal Gurkha Rifles, shot and killed by an Afghan soldier while on patrol near Nahr-e Saraj in Helmand province.

On 13 July, Lt Neal Turkington, aged 26, from 1st Battalion, The Royal Gurkha Rifles, shot and killed by an Afghan soldier while on patrol near Nahr-e Saraj in Helmand province.

On 13 July, Marine Matthew Harrison, aged 23, from Charlie Company, 40 Commando, shot and killed while on patrol near Sangin in Helmand province.

On 13 July, Major James Joshua Bowman, aged 34, from 1st Battalion, The Royal Gurkha Rifles, shot and killed by an Afghan soldier while on patrol near Nahr-e Saraj in Helmand province.

On 16 July, Senior Aircraftman Kinikki Griffiths, aged 20, from the Royal Air Force, died in a crash while on patrol near Camp Bastion in Helmand province.

On 16 July, Marine Jonathan Crookes, aged 26, from 40 Commando, Royal Marines, died in an explosion while on patrol near Sangin in Helmand province.

On 17 July, Sgt David Monkhouse, aged 35, from The Royal Dragoon Guards, died in an explosion while on patrol near Nahr-e Saraj in Helmand province.

On 17 July, Staff Sgt Brett Linley, aged 29, from Royal Logistic Corps, died in an explosion while on patrol near Nahr-e Saraj in Helmand province.

On 21 July, L/Cpl Matthew James Stenton, aged 23, from The Royal Dragoon Guards, shot and killed while on patrol near Lashkar Gah in Helmand province.

On 21 July, L/Cpl Stephen Daniel Monkhouse, aged 28, from 1st Battalion, Scots Guards, shot and killed while on patrol near Lashkar Gah in Helmand province.

On 26 July, Sapper Mark Antony Smith, aged 26, from 36 Engineer Regiment, died in a suspected "friendly fire" incident while on patrol near Sangin in Helmand province.

==== August 2010 ====
On 1 August, Marine Adam Brown, aged 25, from Alpha Company, 40 Commando, died from an explosion in Sangin, Helmand Province.

On 1 August, L/Sgt Dale Alanzo McCallum, aged 31, from 1st Battalion, Scots Guards, shot and killed in the Lashkar Gah district of Helmand Province.

On 7 August, Ken McGonigle, aged 50, a former member of the RUC, saved the life of one of the most senior US officers in Afghanistan when he was killed. He was working in Musa Qal'eh, Helmand province with private security company New Century, when he exchanged fire with two escaped Taliban prisoners who were taking aim with a grenade launcher at a US special forces helicopter leaving a base. The 50-year-old Co Londonderry father of four was shot dead and two US Marines were subsequently killed in the fight. But the MV-22B Osprey aircraft, which can operate as both a helicopter and a turbo-prop aeroplane, escaped. It later emerged that vice admiral Robert Harward, a three-star US Navy SEAL who has been nominated to take over as deputy commander of US forces in Afghanistan, was in the aircraft. His actions later merited the award of the Queens Gallantry Medal.

On 12 August, Rifleman Remand Kulung, aged 27, from 1st Battalion, The Mercian Regiment, died in the UK after being injured when a helicopter crashed into his lookout position within Nahr-e Saraj, Helmand Province.

On 13 August, Lt John Charles Sanderson, aged 29, from G Tobruk Company, 1st Battalion, The Mercian Regiment (Cheshire) attached to 1st Battalion, The Royal Gurkha Rifles Battlegroup, died in the UK after being injured in an explosion within Nahr-e Saraj district, Helmand on 13 July 2010.

On 13 August, Sapper Ishwor Gurung, aged 21, from 69 Gurkha Field Squadron, 21 Engineer Regiment Group, died after being shot in Nad Ali, Helmand Province.

On 13 August, Sapper Darren Foster, aged 20, from 21 Engineer Regiment, shot and killed in Sangin district of Helmand province.

On 21 August, L/Cpl Jordan Dean Bancroft, aged 25, from 1 Platoon, Anzio Company, 1st Battalion, The Duke of Lancaster's Regiment, shot and killed in Afghanistan.

==== September 2010 ====
On 5 September, Captain Andrew Griffiths, aged 25, from 2nd Battalion, The Duke of Lancaster's Regiment, died in the UK after being injured in explosion in Nahr-e Saraj district of Helmand province on 27 August 2010.

On 5 September, L/Cpl Joseph Pool, aged 26, from Royal Scots Borderers, 1st Battalion, the Royal Regiment of Scotland, killed by a rocket-propelled grenade in Nad Ali, Helmand Province.

On 10 September, Kingsman Darren Deady, aged 22, from 2nd Battalion, The Duke of Lancaster's Regiment, died in the UK after being shot in southern Afghanistan on 23 August 2010.

On 18 September, Sgt Andrew Jones, aged 35, from the Royal Engineers attached to Fondouk Squadron, the Queen's Royal Lancers, died in an explosion in Lashkar Gah, Helmand Province.

On 18 September, Trooper Andrew Howarth, aged 20, from the Queen's Royal Lancers attached to 1st Battalion, Scots Guards Battlegroup, died in an explosion west of Lashkar Gah, Helmand Province.

On 25 September, Cpl Matthew Thomas, aged 24, from the Royal Electrical and Mechanical Engineers, died in an explosion in the Garmsir region of Helmand Province.

==== October 2010 ====
On 2 October, Rifleman Suraj Gurung, aged 22, from 1st Battalion, The Royal Gurkha Rifles, died in an explosion in Nahr-e Saraj, Helmand Province.

On 8 October, Sergeant Peter Rayner, aged 34, from 2nd Battalion, The Duke of Lancaster's Regiment, died in an explosion in the Nahr-e Saraj area of Helmand Province.

On 19 October, Acting Corporal David Barnsdale, aged 24, from 33 Engineer Regiment, died in an explosion east of Gereshk, Helmand Province.

On 30 October, Sapper William Blanchard, aged 39, from 101 (City of London) Engineer Regiment, died in an explosion in the Nahr-e Saraj North area, Helmand Province.

==== November 2010 ====
On 7 November, Senior Aircraftman Scott Hughes, aged 20, from 1 Squadron, Royal Air Force Regiment, died at the Cyprus Sovereign Base Area after being hit by a speedboat while undertaking decompression duties.

On 14 November, Ranger Aaron McCormick, aged 22, from the Royal Irish Regiment, died in an explosion in the Nad-e Ali area of Helmand Province.

On 17 November, Guardsman Christopher Davies, aged 22, from 1st Battalion, Irish Guards, shot and killed in the Nahr-e-Saraj district of Helmand Province.

==== December 2010 ====
On 5 December, Private John Howard, aged 23, from 3rd Battalion, The Parachute Regiment, died after being shot by a friendly aircraft.

On 21 December, Corporal Steven Dunn, aged 27, from 216 Parachute Signal Squadron, Royal Corps of Signals, died in an explosion in the Nahr-e Saraj district in Helmand Province.

On 28 December, Warrant Officer Class 2 Charlie Wood, aged 34, from 23 Pioneer Regiment, RLC, died in an explosion in the Lashkar Gah district of Helmand Province.

=== January 2011 to December 2011 ===
==== January 2011 ====
On 1 January, Private Joseva Vatubua, aged 24, of the Argyll and Sutherland Highlanders, was killed in the Nahr-e-Saraj district of central Helmand. Vatubua had been part of an operation targeting known enemy firing positions north of the village of Saidabad Kalayk, when he was killed by a bomb blast from the wall of a compound.

On 25 January, Private Martin Bell, aged 24, of 2nd Battalion, Parachute Regiment, was killed by and IED bomb blast in Spoor Kalay. Private Bell had gone to the aid of another soldier who had stepped on an IED and had both of his legs blown off. Private Bell was able to apply tourniquets and stem the blood loss enough that his severely injured colleague survived. As the casualty was being evacuated, Private Bell stood on a second IED and was fatally injured. For his actions he was awarded the George Medal.

==== February 2011 ====
On 4 February, Ranger David Dalzell, aged 20, of 1st Battalion The Royal Irish Regiment, was fatally wounded in an accident at Check Point Ranger in the Nad-e-Ale district of Helmand. Ranger Dalzell was shot in the chest by a colleague in what was described as tragic accident during a weapon cleaning procedure. Ranger Dalzell, who died instantly, was helping to erect a memorial to a colleague who had been killed when the incident happened.

On 5 February, Warrant Officer Class II (Company Sergeant Major) Colin "Tom" Beckett, aged 36, of 3rd Battalion The Parachute Regiment, was killed by a bomb blast in the village of Sheheed in Helmand Province.

On 9 February, Private Lewis Hendry, aged 20, of the 3rd Battalion of the Parachute Regiment was killed by small arms fire when his patrol came under attack in the Nad-e-Ali district of Helmand Province.

On 9 February, Private Conrad Lewis, aged 22, of the 4th Battalion of the Parachute Regiment was killed by small arms fire when his patrol came under attack in the Nad-e-Ali district of Helmand Province.

On 14 February, Privates Dean Hutchinson, aged 23, and Rob Wood, aged 28, both of the Royal Logistic Corps, died when a fire swept through the tent they were sleeping in whilst on overnight duty. An electrical problem was found to be the root cause of the fire in their tent at Camp Bastion in Helmand Province.

On 14 February, Lance Corporal Kyle Cleet Marshall, aged 23, of the 2nd Battalion of the Parachute Regiment, was killed by a bomb blast in the Nahr-e-Saraj district of Helmand Province.

==== March 2011 ====
On 1 March, Lance Corporal Liam Tasker, aged 26, of the Royal Army Veterinary Corps, 1st Military Working Dog Regiment, died after being engaged with small arms fire whilst on patrol. His dog, Theo, suffered a seizure and died en route back to their base in Helmand Province.

On 9 March, Lance Corporal Stephen McKee, aged 27, of the 1st Battalion the Royal Irish Regiment died when the vehicle he was travelling in struck a roadside bomb.

On 18 March, Private Daniel Prior, aged 27, of the 2nd Battalion of the Parachute Regiment, died in the Queen Elizabeth Hospital in Birmingham. Private Prior had been severely injured by an IED whilst on patrol on 16 March and was flown home but succumbed to his injuries two days later.

On 23 March, Lance Sergeant Mark Burgan, aged 28, and Major Matthew Collins, aged 38, both of 1st Battalion the Irish Guards, died when the vehicle they were travelling in was blown up by a roadside bomb in Helmand Province.

On 31 March, Colour Sergeant Alan Cameron, aged 42, of the 1st Battalion the Scots Guards died at his home in Livingston, Scotland. He had been injured on 13 April 2010 by a roadside bomb. He had endured several operations by the time he had died and an autopsy revealed that his death was directly attributable to the wounds he sustained a year earlier.

==== April 2011 ====
On 19 April, Captain Lisa Head, aged 29, became the second British servicewoman to die in Afghanistan when attempting to disarm a cluster of improvised explosive devices.

==== May 2011 ====
On 15 May, Marine Nigel Dean Mead, aged 19, of 42 Commando Royal Marines, was fatally wounded by an explosion in Helmand province.

On 23 May, Colour Serjeant Kevin Fortuna, aged 36, of 1st Battalion The Rifles, was killed by an explosion whilst on a patrol in the Nahr-e-Saraj district of Helmand Province.

On 27 May, Marine Sam Alexander, aged 28, and Lieutenant Ollie Augustin, aged 23, both of 42 Commando Royal Marines, were killed by a bomb blast inside a compound they were searching in the Nad-e-Ali district of Helmand Province.

==== June 2011 ====
On 3 June, Corporal Michael John Pike, aged 25, of The Royal Regiment of Scotland, died after receiving a gunshot wound to the head whilst operating a gun on Jackal vehicle in the Lashkar gah district of Helmand Province.

On 5 June, Rifleman Martin Lamb, aged 27, of 1st Battalion The Rifles died from injuries sustained in a bomb blast in the Nahr-e-Saraj district of Helmand Province.

On 5 June, Lance Corporal Martin Gill, aged 22, of 42 Commando Royal Marines, was fatally wounded in the neck and head whilst being the coverman for his colleagues who were conducting searches on locals in the Nahr-e-Saraj district of Helmand Province.

On 16 June, Craftsman Andrew Found, aged 27, Royal Electrical and Mechanical Engineers who was serving with D Squadron (Warthog Group), Royal Scots Dragoon Guards, was killed in an explosion while on an operation near Adinza'i in the Gereshk Valley area, within the northern Nahr-e Saraj district of Helmand province.

On 16 June, Corporal Lloyd Newell, of the Parachute Regiment was killed by small arms fire in Helmand Province. Due to Cpl Newell's work, his age at the time of his death was not released.

On 18 June, Private Gareth Bellingham, aged 22, of the 3rd Battalion Mercian Regiment (The Staffords) was killed after coming under small arms fire as he was rushing to help an Afghan civilian who had been injured by an IED.

==== July 2011 ====
On 4 July, Highlander Scott McLaren, aged 20, of the 4th Battalion, Royal Regiment of Scotland, was found dead in Nahr-e-Saraj, central Helmand province. Highlander McLaren had left a secure area on his own to retrieve equipment left behind by the patrol earlier in the day. He was captured by the Taliban and executed.

On 16 July, Lance Corporal Paul Watkins, aged 24, of the 9th/12 Royal Lancers, was killed by small arms fire whilst on patrol in the Nahr-e-Saraj district of Helmand Province. It was later determined that he had been shot by a Taliban Sleeper agent dressed in an Afghan national Army uniform.

On 18 July, Corporal Mark Palin, aged 32, of the 1st battalion The Rifles, was killed by an IED in the Nahr-e-Saraj district of Helmand Province.

==== August 2011 ====
On 5 August, Marine James Wright, aged 22, of Juliet Company, 42 Commando Royal Marines, died in Camp Bastion of wounds sustained whilst on patrol in the Nahr-e-Saraj district of Helmand Province. Marine Wright was injured when a grenade was thrown at his patrol and despite receiving medical attention and being evacuated to the hospital at Camp Bastion, he succumbed to his wounds.

On 12 August, Lieutenant Daniel Clack, 1st Battalion The Rifles, was killed by an IED whilst on foot patrol in the Nahr-e-Saraj district of Helmand Province. The blast also wounded four members of his patrol team.

On 30 August, Sergeant Barry Weston of 42 Commando, Royal Marines, was killed outright by a legacy ordnance blast in the Nahr-e-Saraj district of Helmand Province. Because the bomb had been there for a considerable amount of time, there were no groundsigns to enable its location to be observed.

==== September 2011 ====
On 14 September, Lance Corporal Jonathan McKinlay, aged 33, of the 1st Battalion, The Rifles, was shot dead when his patrol came under small arms fire in the Nahr-e-Saraj District of Helmand Province.

On 19 September, Marine David Fairbrother, aged 24, of 42 Commando, Royal Marines, was fatally wounded in the head after his patrol came under small arms fire in the Nahr-e-Saraj district of Helmand Province.

==== October 2011 ====
On 15 October, Rifleman Vijay Rai, aged 22, of the 1st Battalion Rifles Battle Group, was killed by small arms fire at a checkpoint in Helmand Province.

==== November 2011 ====
On 3 November, Private Matthew Haseldin, aged 21, of the Mercian Regiment, was killed in Helmand Province when his patrol came under attack. A round entered his body from the side which was not protected by his body armour.

On 9 November, Private Matthew Thornton, aged 28, from 4th Battalion The Yorkshire Regiment (4 YORKS) was a Territorial Army soldier who deployed to Afghanistan with Support Company, 1st Battalion The Yorkshire Regiment (1 YORKS), as an element of Combined Force Lashkar Gah (The Queen's Royal Hussars Battle Group) in October 2011. He operated out of Checkpoint Khoorashan in the Babaji area at the northern tip of the Lashkar Gah district. Pvt Thornton's group and another multiple were patrolling to the north of Checkpoint Loy Mandeh in order to engage with the Afghan people and to develop a better understanding of their area. During the patrol his multiple was engaged by small arms fire and grenades. While he was manoeuvring and returning fire he was caught in the blast from an improvised explosive device and tragically was killed.

On 16 November, Lance Corporal Peter Eustace, aged 22, from 2nd, Battalion The Rifles deployed to Afghanistan as a mortar fire controller with Delhi Company of 1st Battalion The Yorkshire Regiment, attached to Combined Force Nahr-e Saraj (North) in Helmand province. He was killed by an improvised explosive device (IED) on 16 November 2011 while conducting a joint patrol with his company and the Afghan National Army.

On 17 November, Lieutenant David Alexander Grant Boyce, aged 25, and Lance Corporal Richard Scanlon, aged 31, both from 1st The Queen's Dragoon Guards were serving with the Formation Reconnaissance Squadron. They were on a patrol providing security in the Yakchal region of Nahr-e Saraj in central Helmand when their armoured vehicle struck an improvised explosive device. Tragically, both men were killed in the resulting explosion.

On 20 November, Private Thomas Lake, aged 29, from 1st Battalion The Princess of Wales's Royal Regiment, was taking part in a patrol to reassure the local population in the Jamal Kowi area of the Nahr-e Saraj district of central Helmand when he was caught in an explosion. He was airlifted to the field hospital at Camp Bastion, where he was declared killed in action.

On 27 November, Rifleman Sheldon Steel, aged 20, of 5th Battalion The Rifles, was killed by an improvised explosive device while on foot patrol in Babaji, in the Lashkar Gah area of Nahr-e Saraj district, Helmand province.

==== December 2011 ====
On 8 December, Sapper Elijah Bond, aged 24, from 35 Engineer Regiment, died at the Queen Elizabeth Hospital in Birmingham on Thursday 8 December 2011. This was as a result of wounds sustained when he was injured in a blast from an improvised explosive device on 6 December.

On 22 December, Captain Tom Jennings, aged 29, Royal Marines, died after the vehicle he was travelling in struck an explosive device while on an operation to the south of Kabul.

On 23 December, Squadron Leader Anthony Downing, aged 34, RAF, was seriously wounded when the vehicle he was travelling in was caught in an explosion south of Kabul on Thursday 22 December. He was flown back to the UK where he died of his wounds at the Queen Elizabeth Hospital, Birmingham. His family were with him when he died. Captain Tom Jennings, Royal Marines, whose death was announced separately by the Ministry of Defence, had been travelling in the same vehicle.

On 30 December, Private John King, aged 19, from 1st Battalion The Yorkshire Regiment was taking part in a partnered foot patrol with Afghan National Security Forces to increase security around the village of Llara Kalay, in the Nahr-e Saraj district of Helmand province. The patrol had identified insurgents in the area and had begun to search and clear a number of compounds in the village. The Afghan National Army members of the patrol came under fire from insurgents and the International Security Assistance Force (ISAF) soldiers moved forwards to support them. During the firefight Private King was caught in the blast from an Improvised Explosive Device (IED) and was killed in action, despite the best efforts of medics at the scene.

=== January 2012 to December 2012 ===
==== January 2012 ====
On 2 January, Rifleman Sachin Limbu, aged 23, of B Sari Bari Company, 1st Battalion The Royal Gurkha Rifles, at the Queen Elizabeth Hospital in Birmingham. He died from wounds sustained on 24 January 2010 that were caused by a hidden IED.

On 24 January, Signaller Ian Gerard Sartorius-Jones, aged 21, from 20th Armoured Brigade Headquarters and Signal Squadron (200) at Forward Operating Base Khar Nikah in the Nahr-e Saraj district of Helmand province, Afghanistan. He died from a gunshot wound that was not due to hostile action.

On 27 January, Lance Corporal Gajbahadur Gurung, aged 26, was serving with 1st Battalion The Yorkshire Regiment as part of Combined Force Nahr-e Saraj (North). He was part of an ISAF foot patrol to disrupt insurgent activity in the Khar Nikah region of the Nahr-e Saraj district of Helmand province when he received a fatal gunshot wound.

==== February 2012 ====
On 13 February, Senior Aircraftsman Ryan Tomlin, aged 21 from the RAF Regiment, 2 Squadron, RAF was taking part in a partnered patrol to reassure and interact with the local population in the western Dashte area on the edge of Nad-e-Ali district in central Helmand province when he was fatally wounded by small arms fire from an insurgent attack. He was evacuated by air to the field hospital at Camp Bastion, where he died of his wounds.

==== March 2012 ====
On 6 March, Sergeant Nigel Coupe, aged 33, from 1st Battalion The Duke of Lancaster's Regiment, and Corporal Jake Hartley, aged 20, Private Anthony Frampton, aged 20, Private Christopher Kershaw, aged 19, Private Daniel Wade, aged 20, Private Daniel Wilford, aged 21 all from 3rd Battalion The Yorkshire regiment were killed in the Lashkar Gah Durai region of an operational area on the border of Helmand and Kandahar provinces. They were on a patrol to dominate the area and maintain freedom of movement when their Warrior armoured fighting vehicle was struck by an improvised explosive device resulting, tragically, in the deaths of all six personnel.

On 21 March, Captain Rupert William Michael Bowers, aged 26, from 2nd Battalion The Mercian Regiment, attached to 2nd Battalion The Rifles, operating as an advisor to the Afghan National Army was killed by a blast from an IED. Captain Bowers commanded a small team responsible for the training and development of the Afghan National Army based in Forward Operating Base Ouellette, in the Mirmandab region of Nahr-e Saraj district in Helmand province. On 21 March 2012, Captain Bowers was leading a patrol to clear a position of the threat of insurgents when he was killed in the blast from an improvised explosive device.

On 26 March, Sergeant Luke Taylor, aged 33, of the Royal Marines, and Lance Corporal Michael Foley, aged 25, of the Adjutant General's Corps (Staff and Personnel Support), were serving as part of Task Force Helmand when they were shot and killed at the main entrance to Lashkar Gah Main Operating Base in Helmand province.

==== April 2012 ====
On 8 April, Corporal Jack Stanley, aged 26, from The Queens Royal Hussars, died at the Queen Elizabeth Hospital Birmingham from wounds sustained in Afghanistan in February 2012

On 18 April, Sapper Connor Ray, aged 21, from 33 Engineer Regiment (Explosive Ordnance Disposal) died in hospital in Birmingham on 18 April 2012 from wounds sustained in Afghanistan. On 11 April 2012, Sapper Ray was involved in a search and clearance operation in the Nad-e-Ali district of central Helmand near to Checkpoint Kahmanan. The aim of the mission was to clear a compound previously used by insurgents, allowing the local population to safely return to the area. During this operation Sapper Ray was seriously injured in an IED strike. He received immediate medical attention before being taken to the Camp Bastion Role 3 Hospital and was later evacuated to the Queen Elizabeth Hospital in Birmingham.

On 27 April, Guardsman Michael Roland, aged 22, from 1st Battalion Grenadier Guards was killed. Guardsman Roland deployed with his company on a three-day operation to disrupt insurgent activity in a contested area in the north of Nahr-e Saraj district. On the morning of 27 April 2012 he was fatally wounded during an exchange of small arms fire. He was extracted back to the hospital in Camp Bastion but died of his injuries.

==== May 2012 ====
On 4 May, Corporal Andrew Steven Roberts, aged 32, and Private Ratu Manasa Silibaravi, aged 33, were both of 23 Pioneer Regiment, The Royal Logistics Corps and attached to the 1st Battalion The Royal Welsh Battle Group, serving as part of Combined Force Burma. They were killed in an indirect fire attack on Forward Operating Base Ouellette, in the northern part of Nahr-e Saraj district.

On 12 May, Corporal Brent John McCarthy, aged 25, Royal Air Force, and Lance Corporal Lee Thomas Davies, aged 27, 1st Battalion Welsh Guards were killed by small arms fire while deployed as part of a Police Advisory Team to attend a meeting at the local Afghan Uniform Police headquarters near Patrol Base Attal in the Lashkar Gah district of Helmand province.

On 26 May, Captain Stephen James Healey, aged 29, from 1st Battalion The Royal Welsh, commanded the Combined Force Burma reconnaissance platoon and, while conducting a vehicle patrol in the north of the Nahr-e Saraj district of Helmand province, his vehicle struck an improvised explosive device. He was given immediate first aid before being flown to the military hospital at Camp Bastion where his death was confirmed.

==== June 2012 ====
On 1 June, Corporal Michael John Thacker, aged 27, from 1st Battalion The Royal Welsh, as part of the Fire Support Group manning Observation Post "Tir" in the Nahr-e Saraj district of Helmand province when he was hit by small arms fire. He received immediate medical attention and was evacuated by helicopter, but died despite the efforts of medical staff.

On 3 June, Private Gregg Thomas Stone, aged 20, from 3rd Battalion The Yorkshire Regiment, was part of an operation to apprehend a group of insurgents who had abducted a member of the Afghan Police. It was during this operation that his unit came under fire and Private Stone was fatally wounded.

On 13 June, Lance Corporal James Ashworth, aged 20, from the 1st Battalion Grenadier Guards was serving as part of the Reconnaissance Platoon, 1st Battalion Grenadier Guards. He was on a patrol in the Nahri Saraj District of Helmand Province. He was leading a fire-team, clearing out compounds, when his team came under fire from Taliban armed with rifles and rocket-propelled grenades from several mud huts. Ashworth charged the huts, providing cover for his team who followed in single file behind him. After his fire-team took out most of the insurgents, Ashworth pursued the final remaining member. He crawled forward under cover of a low wall while his team provided covering fire and acted as a diversion. When he got within 5 metres (16 ft) of the enemy, he was killed as he attempted to throw a grenade. Captain Michael Dobbin, commander of the platoon, who was awarded the Military Cross for repeated courage throughout the operational tour, said about Ashworth, "His professionalism under pressure and ability to remain calm in what was a chaotic situation is testament to his character. L/Cpl Ashworth was a pleasure to command and I will sorely miss his calming influence on the battlefield. Softly spoken, he stepped up to every task thrown in his direction." After his death, his body was taken to Camp Bastion and was then repatriated to the United Kingdom. On 16 March 2013, British media reported that Ashworth was to be posthumously awarded the Victoria Cross for bravery and this was confirmed by the Ministry of Defence on 18 March 2013. His citation was read out at the Grenadier Guard barracks in Aldershot. He was only the second person to be awarded the medal during the Taliban insurgency, after Bryan Budd for his actions in 2006. Ashworth is the 14th person to be awarded the Victoria Cross since the end of the Second World War. The Victoria Cross was first awarded for actions in the Crimean War of 1854–56, and is the highest British military award for bravery.

On 15 June, Corporal Alex William Guy, aged 37, of 1st Battalion The Royal Anglian Regiment commanded a fire support section in the Nad 'Ali district of Helmand province. His section was conducting a partnered patrol with elements of the Afghan National Army when they were caught in an insurgent ambush. Corporal Guy was leading his section forward to assist a group of Afghan soldiers who were pinned down by enemy fire when he was fatally wounded.

==== July 2012 ====
On 1 July, Warrant Officer Class 2 Leonard Perran Thomas, aged 44, of the Royal Corps of Signals, Guardsman Craig Andrew Roderick, aged 22 and Guardsman Apete Saunikalou Ratumaiyale Tuisovurua, aged 28 of the 1st Battalion Welsh Guards, were part of a patrol to a checkpoint known as Kamparack Pul to help organise a meeting (shura) with the local detachment of Afghan National Civil Order Police. Having completed their task and on leaving the compound, they were attacked by small arms fire and fatally wounded. They were based in Forward Operating Base Ouellette in the Nahr-e Saraj district of Helmand province, Afghanistan.

==== August 2012 ====
On 9 August, Lieutenant Andrew Robert Chesterman, aged 26, from 3rd Battalion The Rifles, was commanding a vehicle patrol in the Nad-e-Ali district of Helmand province when the lead vehicle struck an improvised explosive device. As he moved forward to take control of the situation the patrol was engaged by insurgent small arms fire and Lieutenant Chesterman was shot. Despite the best efforts of his fellow Riflemen at the scene, the Medical Emergency Response Team and the staff at the Bastion Hospital, Lieutenant Chesterman could not be saved.

On 10 August, Lance Corporal Matthew David Smith, aged 26, from the Corps of Royal Engineers, was part of a troop that had been tasked to build a new checkpoint next to the Nahr-e Bughra canal in the Nad-e-Ali district of Helmand province when he was hit by small arms fire. He received immediate first aid before being evacuated by helicopter but, despite all efforts to save him, he died of his wounds.

On 17 August, Guardsman Jamie Shadrake, aged 20, of the Reconnaissance Platoon, 1st Battalion Grenadier Guards, died of gunshot wounds when his checkpoint was attacked by insurgents in the Nahr-e Saraj district of Helmand province.,

==== September 2012 ====
On 7 September, Guardsman Karl Whittle, aged 22, from the 1st Battalion Grenadier Guards died in Queen Elizabeth Hospital Birmingham, died from gunshot wounds sustained when his checkpoint was attacked by insurgents in the Nahr-e Saraj district of Helmand province on 14 August 2012.

On 9 September, Sergeant Lee Paul Davidson, aged 32, of the Light Dragoons, as on patrol with the Afghan Uniform Police in the Nahr-e Saraj district of Helmand province. Sergeant Davidson's Ridgeback, the rear vehicle of the column, struck an improvised explosive device and was fatally wounded.

On 14 September, Lance Corporal Duane Groom, aged 32, from Queen's Company, 1st Battalion Grenadier Guards, was killed in action when his vehicle struck an improvised explosive device in the Nahr-e Saraj district of Helmand province.

On 15 September, Sergeant Gareth Thursby, aged 29, and Private Thomas Wroe, aged 18, both of 3rd Battalion The Yorkshire Regiment (3 YORKS), were shot and fatally wounded by a rogue Afghan Local Policeman in Checkpoint Tora in the Nahr-e Saraj district of Helmand province.

On 21 September, Sergeant Jonathan Eric Kups, aged 38, from the Royal Electrical and Mechanical Engineers, died at Camp Bastion, Helmand province, southern Afghanistan. Further details have not been disclosed.

On 21 September, Captain James Anthony Townley, aged 29, from the Corps of Royal Engineers died in Camp Bastion, Helmand province, southern Afghanistan, from wounds sustained whilst serving at Forward Operating Base Shawqat.

On 24 September, Captain Carl Manley, aged 41, of the Royal Marines died at Bagram Air Force Base from what are believed to be natural causes.

==== October 2012 ====
On 24 October, Corporal David O'Connor, aged 27, from 40 Commando Royal Marines, and Corporal Channing Day, aged 25 from 3 Medical Regiment, were participating in a patrol with C Company, 40 Commando to conduct low level training with the Afghan Local Police. While en route to conduct that training, the patrol came under small arms fire near the village of Char Kutsa. As a result of the engagement Corporal O'Connor was fatally injured alongside his colleague and patrol medic Corporal Day. Corporal Day was the third female member of British Forces to be killed in Afghanistan.

On 30 October, Lieutenant Edward Drummond-Baxter, aged 29, and Lance Corporal Siddhanta Kunwar, aged 28, both from 1st Battalion The Royal Gurkha Rifles, were based in Checkpoint Prrang in the southern area of the Nahr-e Saraj district of Helmand province. Both men were attached to 40 Commando Royal Marines. They were participating in a shura (meeting) with members of the Afghan Uniform Police inside the checkpoint. On completion of the shura, they were shot and killed by a man wearing an Afghan police uniform who had been attending the meeting.

==== November 2012 ====
On 11 November, Captain Walter Reid Barrie, aged 41, from 1st Battalion The Royal Regiment of Scotland (1 SCOTS) was taking part in a football match between British soldiers and members of the Afghan National Army at Forward Operating Base Shawqat in the Nad-e-Ali district of Helmand province when he was shot at close range by a member of the Afghan Army. He was fatally injured in the attack.

=== January 2013 to December 2013 ===
==== January 2013 ====
On 7 January, Sapper Richard Walker, aged 23, from 28 Engineering Regiment, attached to 21 Engineering Regiment as part of the Task Force Helmand Engineering Group. Sapper Walker was shot in an apparent "insider attack" by a member of the Afghan National Army (ANA) at Patrol Base Hazrat in the Nahr-e Saraj district of Helmand province on Monday 7 January 2013. He was working on a construction task with other military engineers from his troop, as part of the preparations to hand the camp over to Afghan security forces, when the Afghan soldier turned his weapon on ANA and ISAF soldiers at the base. The incident resulted in a number of casualties, all of whom were extracted to the Bastion Role 3 medical facility where Sapper Walker was pronounced dead.

On 16 January, Kingsman David Robert Shaw, aged 23, of 1st Battalion The Duke of Lancaster's, sustained a gunshot wound when his checkpoint came under fire from insurgents in the Lashkar Gah district of Helmand province on 13 January 2013. He died in the Queen Elizabeth Hospital Birmingham three days later from wounds sustained in Afghanistan.

==== March 2013 ====
On 26 March, Lance Corporal Jamie Webb, aged 24, of 1st Battalion The Mercian Regiment, died of wounds sustained during an insurgent attack on his base in the Nad-e-Ali district of Helmand.

==== April 2013 ====
On 30 April, Corporal William Savage, aged 30, Fusilier Samuel Flint, aged 21, both of the 2nd Battalion The Royal Regiment of Scotland, Royal Highland Fusiliers, Private Robert Hetherington, aged 25, of 7th Battalion The Royal Regiment of Scotland, 51st Highland, were killed when their Mastiff struck an IED. These were the first British deaths in a Mastiff armoured vehicle.

==== October 2013 ====
On 15 October, Lance Corporal James Brynin, aged 22, an intelligence Corps soldier attached to 14th Signal Regiment (Electronic warfare), was killed after coming under fire in Nahr-e Saraj. At an inquest into his death being conducted in January 2017, it was formally stated that LCpl Brynin was fatally wounded by a fellow British Army soldier in a "Blue on Blue" incident. However, the soldier that shot Brynin would not face criminal prosecutions over the incident.

==== November 2013 ====
On 5 November, Warrant Officer Class 2 Ian Fisher, aged 42, from 3rd Battalion The Mercian Regiment, killed by vehicle-borne suicide attack while on patrol.

==== December 2013 ====
On 23 December, Captain Richard Holloway Royal Engineers (att SBS), aged 29, was killed in combat in the East of Kabul

=== January 2014 to December 2015 ===
==== March 2014 ====
On 5 March, Sapper Adam Moralee, aged 23, from 32 Engineer Regiment, died preparing engineer plant equipment for redeployment within Camp Bastion. Moralee was killed instantly when the bucket on the earthmover that he and his team were cleaning moved downwards and one of its teeth speared him between the shoulder blades. In April 2017, two members of the cleaning team were sentenced at a military court in Catterick to nine months in prison (for the lance corporal in charge) and an 18-month suspended prison term with a curfew for the operative who moved the lever in the cab and made the bucket fall. Both were initially charged with manslaughter, but were both convicted on a lesser charge of negligence.

==== April 2014 ====
On 26 April, Captain Thomas Clarke, aged 30, Flight Lieutenant Rakesh Chauhan, aged 29, Warrant Officer Class 2 Spencer Faulkner, aged 38, Corporal James Walters, aged 36 and Lance Corporal Oliver Thomas, aged 26, died in a Lynx helicopter crash in Takhta Pul district within Kandahar Province.

==== July 2015 ====
On 23 July, Lance Corporal Michael Campbell, aged 32, from 3 Royal Welsh, died at Queen Elizabeth Hospital Birmingham from wounds sustained in Afghanistan on 3 April 2012 .

==== October 2015 ====
On 11 October, Flight Lieutenant Geraint Roberts and Flight Lieutenant Alan Scott, both of 230 Squadron Royal Air Force, died when the Puma helicopter they were piloting crashed in Kabul.

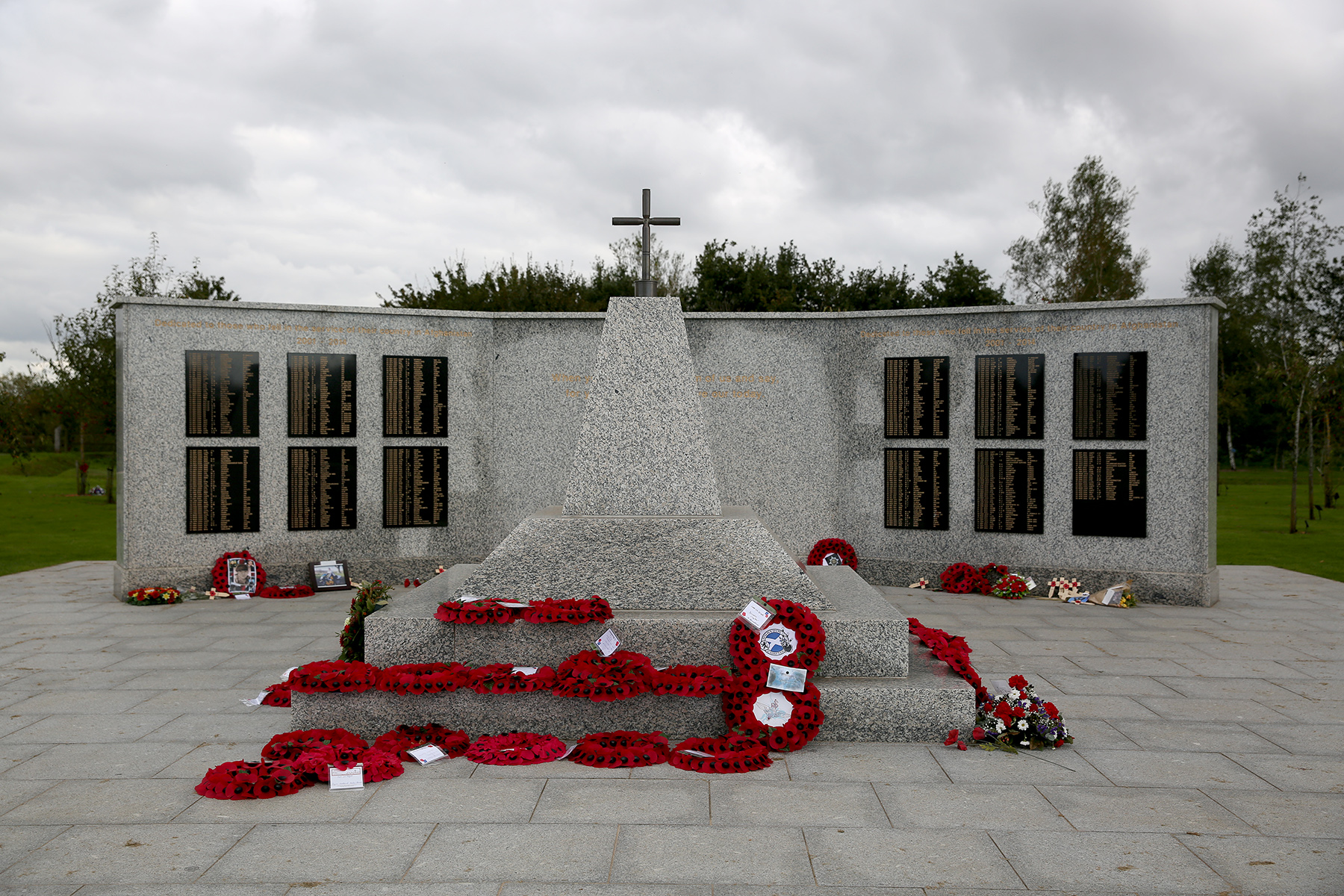
The replica of the memorial from Camp Bastion at the National Memorial Arboretum.

=== January 2016 to December 2020 ===
==== February 2020 ====
On 22 February, Private Joseph Berry, aged 21, from 2nd Battalion, The Parachute Regiment, died of a non-combat related injury while on operations in Kabul.

== Political impact ==
British casualties in Afghanistan have had a major political impact, although not as significant as the impact of British casualties in Iraq. This is mainly because the three main British political parties (Labour, Conservatives and the Liberal Democrats) all support British operations in the country. However British casualties in the middle of 2006 did lead to the government's decision to reinforce the British contingent.

Toward the end of 2008 the numbers of troops being killed or seriously injured while travelling in lightly armoured Snatch Land Rovers in both Iraq and Afghanistan raised questions in the United Kingdom Parliament about the suitability of the vehicles for use in these theatres. Members of the public and families of killed and injured servicemen have campaigned about perceived problems with these vehicles including an online petition to the office of the prime minister.

== See also ==
- War in Afghanistan (2001–2021)
- Coalition casualties in Afghanistan
- Canadian Forces casualties in Afghanistan
- Civilian casualties of the U.S. invasion of Afghanistan
- International public opinion on the war in Afghanistan
- List of post-1945 U.S. friendly-fire incidents with British victims
- International Security Assistance Force
- Taliban insurgency
- Operation Herrick
