= Sam Alexander (Royal Marine) =

Royal Marine

Samuel Giles William Alexander MC (16 June 1982 − 27 May 2011) was a Royal Marine whose death by an improvised explosive device (IED) while on a patrol in 2011 during the War in Afghanistan received 3/4 front page as part of cover story questioning the Government's foreign policy by his journalist father in The Independent, which had taken a strong stance against parts of the United Kingdom's involvement in the war on terror. Alexander's Military Cross awarded on previous tour of duty contributed to extensive national media coverage after the Ministry of Defence announcement of his and his patrol leader's deaths during Operation Herrick in Helmand Province in 2011. Their deaths were also later included in speech by MP Richard Drax in the House of Commons and extensively referenced by national media as mitigating circumstances in connection with the 2013 conviction of Sgt. Alexander Blackman for murder of an injured Afghan combatant (a.k.a. 2011 Helmand Province incident) and his subsequent reduced sentence in 2017 of manslaughter on the grounds of diminished responsibility.

== See also ==
- British Forces casualties in Afghanistan since 2001
- Operation Herrick
- 2011 Helmand Province incident
