= Lisa Head =

British Army soldier

Lisa Jade Head
- Born: 30 November 1981; Huddersfield, England
- Died: 19 April 2011 (aged 29); Queen Elizabeth Hospital, Birmingham
- Military career
- Allegiance: United Kingdom
- Branch: British Army
- Service years: 2006–2011
- Rank: Captain
- Unit: 11 Explosive Ordnance Disposal Regiment RLC

Captain Lisa Jade Head (30 November 1981 – 19 April 2011) was a British Army officer. She was the first female bomb disposal officer to be killed on operations. She died on 19 April 2011 at the age of 29, having sustained serious injuries on active service in Afghanistan. At the time of her death, Head was the first female officer and the second British servicewoman to die in Afghanistan since 2001, after Sarah Bryant, and the 364th member of the British armed forces in total.

== Life ==
Born in Huddersfield, West Yorkshire, Head attended Greenhead College and studied human biology at the University of Huddersfield, her military training began whilst at University where she was part of the Leeds University Officers' Training Corps, before attending the Royal Military Academy at Sandhurst.

She served in Iraq and Afghanistan as an air transport liaison officer with the Royal Logistic Corps before being transferred to 321 Explosive Ordnance Disposal (EOD) Squadron, 11 Explosive Ordnance Department, Royal Logistic Corps, with whom she served in Northern Ireland. She was deployed to Afghanistan on 27 March 2011. She was a bomb disposal specialist and had achieved the "High Threat IED Operators" status indicating great expertise.

== Death ==
She was mortally injured in Nahr-e-Saraj in Helmand Province on 18 April 2011, 22 days after arriving in Afghanistan for the second time, while attempting to disable a cluster of improvised explosive devices, which defence sources said had been placed to catch out a bomb disposal expert. She disabled one device, but was hit when a second device in the chain went off. She was evacuated by helicopter to Camp Bastion, northwest of Lashkar Gah, from where she was flown back to Queen Elizabeth hospital in Birmingham. She died there the following day.

== Funeral ==
Head's funeral was held on 6 May 2011 at Huddersfield Parish Church. A guard of honour from her regiment lined the steps of the church at the funeral procession and carried her coffin into the church. More than 1,000 people attended the funeral, including family, friends, military personnel and residents of Huddersfield.

== See also ==
- Sarah Bryant, the first British servicewoman killed in Afghanistan
