= Sarah Bryant (British Army soldier) =

British army soldier

Sarah Louise Bryant
- Corporal Sarah Bryant
- Born: Sarah Louise Feely; 17 December 1981; Liverpool, England
- Died: 17 June 2008 (aged 26); Helmand Province, Afghanistan
- Burial place: Wetheral Cemetery; 54.879852°N 2.840112°W
- Military career
- Allegiance: United Kingdom
- Branch: British Army
- Service years: 2002–2008
- Rank: Corporal
- Service number: W1046062
- Unit: 15(UK) PSYOPS Gp

Corporal Sarah Louise Bryant (née Feely) (17 December 1981 – 17 June 2008), of the British Army's Intelligence Corps, was the first British servicewoman killed in Afghanistan.

== Career ==
Born in Liverpool and raised in Cumbria, Feely joined the Army in 2002 and completed basic training at Army Training Regiment Winchester as a soldier in the Intelligence Corps. Following specialist training at the Defence Intelligence and Security Centre (DISC), Chicksands, she was initially posted to Whitehall, London. She was then posted to 11 Military Intelligence Section, Headquarters 1st (UK) Armoured Division in Herford, Germany, and completed two tours in Iraq at Basra and then Baghdad. Whilst in Baghdad she received a medal and commendation from the US forces commander who described her as "a credit to the British Army".

She married in 2005 in Wetheral, Cumbria, to a fellow Intelligence Corps soldier.

As a Corporal, Bryant later joined 15 Psychological Operations Group based at DISC, deploying to Afghanistan in March 2008 as a Target Audience Analyst. Her team, 152 DELTA Psychological Operations Effects Team, was part of the PsyOps Support Element (PSE) supporting Headquarters 16 Air Assault Brigade, commanding Task Force Helmand.

== Fatality ==
Corporal Bryant died whilst taking part in an operation east of Lashkar Gah when the Land Rover SNATCH 2 vehicle in which she and four other soldiers were travelling received the blast of an improvised explosive device. All but one of the occupants of the vehicle died.

After her remains had been repatriated to RAF Lyneham, Bryant's military funeral took place at Holy Trinity church in Wetheral, where she had married her husband two years previously. She is buried at Wetheral Cemetery.

Bryant's name was later added to the roll of honour for Burscough and Lathom Royal British Legion branch and Burscough War memorial, and the Wetheral Lych Gate war memorial. The Intelligence Corps will henceforth award the Sarah Bryant Medal to the student who "best espouses the Values and Standards of the British Army" as voted by his or her peers when passing out from the Chicksands Intelligence training courses.

Her death received a great deal of coverage in the UK and international media, which in turn provoked discussion on the gendered nature of the war on terror.

== Honours and decorations ==
- Iraq Medal
- Operational Service Medal for Afghanistan
- United States Army Commendation Medal (posthumous)
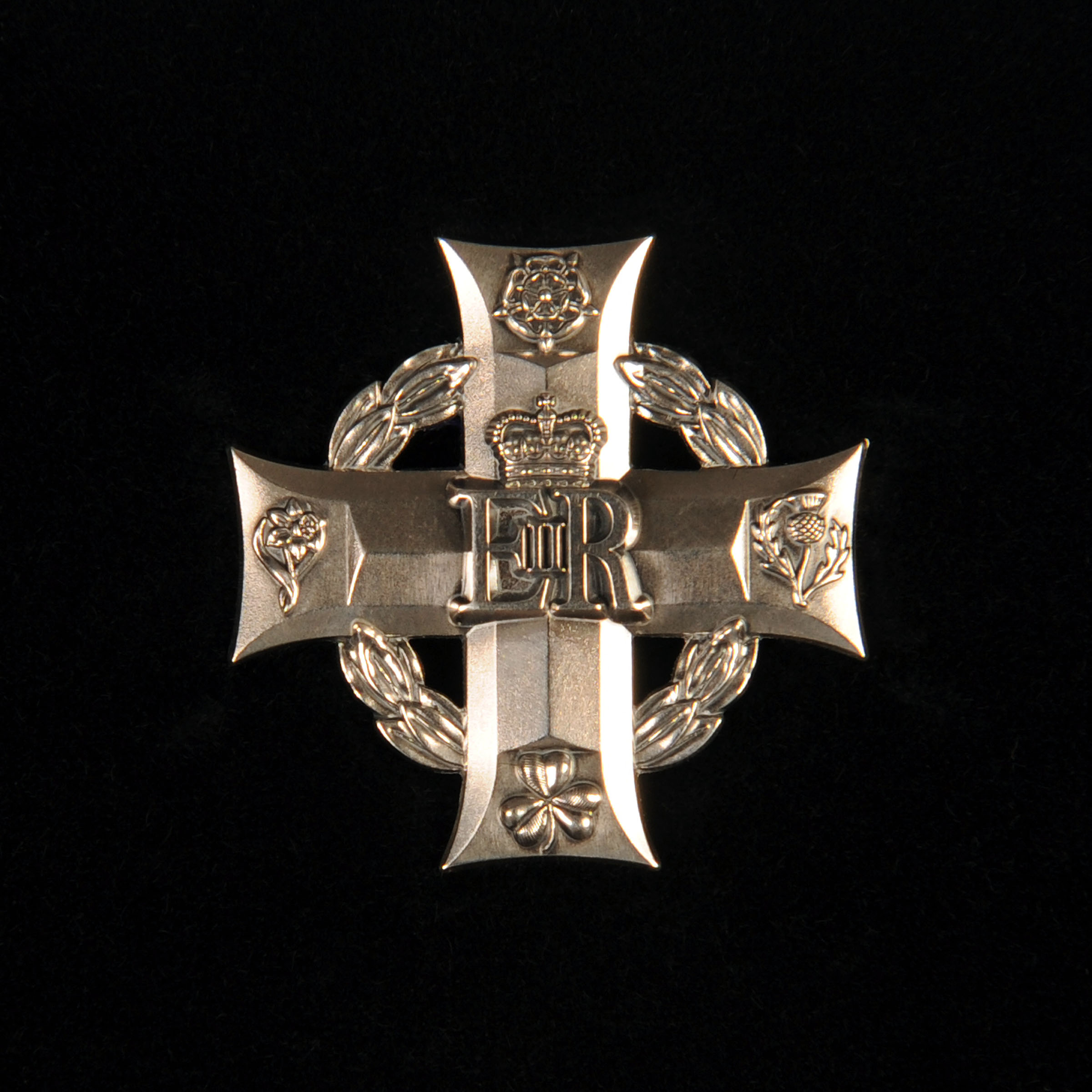
- Elizabeth Cross

== See also ==
- Lisa Head
