= Deaths in January 1981 =

The following is a list of notable deaths in January 1981.

Entries for each day are listed alphabetically by surname. A typical entry lists information in the following sequence:

- Name, age, country of citizenship at birth, subsequent country of citizenship (if applicable), reason for notability, cause of death (if known), and reference.

== January 1981 ==
=== 1 ===
- Neville Coleman, 50, English footballer.
- Frank Elsass, 67, American cornetist and conductor.
- Oumarou Ganda, 45, Nigerien actor and film director.
- Ceferino Garcia, 74, Filipino-American boxer.
- Albert Henry, 74, Cook Islands politician, prime minister (1965–1978), heart attack.
- Manuel de Irujo, 89, Spanish politician.
- Marjory Jarman, 79, English scouting leader, complications from surgery.
- Kathleen Le Messurier, 82, Australian tennis player.
- David Littmann, 74, American cardiologist.
- Hephzibah Menuhin, 60, American-Australian pianist and human rights activist.
- Kazimierz Michałowski, 79, Polish archaeologist.
- Mauri Rose, 74, American racing driver.
- Sir John Stacey, 56, British RAF commander.
- Matt Vaniel, 61, American basketball player.
- Carl Vitz, 97, American librarian and author.
- Wang Shanyuan, 73, Chinese microbiologist.

=== 2 ===
- John P. Bethell, 73, American politician, member of the Arkansas House of Representatives (1949–1972).
- Victor Carin, 47, Scottish actor and translator, pancreatic cancer.
- Arthur W. Carpenter, 89, American rubber chemist.
- Bud Green, 83, Austrian-born American lyricist ("That's My Weakness Now", "Alabamy Bound").
- William S. McEllroy, 87, American tennis player and physician.
- William Schiøpffe, 54, Danish jazz drummer.
- Richard Watts Jr., 82, American theatre critic and journalist, cardiac arrest.

=== 3 ===
- Princess Alice, Countess of Athlone, 97, British royal, last surviving grandchild of Queen Victoria.
- Peter Bennie, 81, Scottish footballer.
- Marie Eline, 78, American silent actress
- Karl Evang, 78, Norwegian physician and civil servant.
- Lou Fette, 73, American baseball player, heart attack.
- Edith Marguerite Harrington, 87, English secretary, grandmother of Queen Camilla.
- Felton Jarvis, 46, American record producer, stroke.
- Josef Lainck, 73, German businessman and concentration camp survivor.
- Marvin Opler, 66, American anthropologist.
- Alfred Proksch, 89, Austrian politician.
- Margaret Bartlett Thornton, 79, American aviator and poet.
- Khadijeh Afzal Vaziri, 91, Iranian women's rights activist.

=== 4 ===
- Walter Bötcher, 82, German politician and jurist.
- Kenneth Carey, 87, American Olympic sailor (1932).
- Morrie Church, 58, New Zealand rugby coach.
- Aage Thor Falkanger Sr., 78, Norwegian judge.
- Bruno Fortichiari, 88, Italian politician
- Sterling B. Hendricks, 78, American agriculturalist.
- Ruth Lowe, 66, Canadian pianist and songwriter ("I'll Never Smile Again"), cancer.
- Doy Reed, 85, Australian footballer.
- Doris Schroeder, 87, American screenwriter.
- Gordon Charles Steele, 89, English naval captain.
- Mildred F. Taylor, 75, American politician, member of the New York State Assembly (1947–1960).

=== 5 ===
- Elyse Aehle, 86, American violinist and conductor.
- Lomer Brisson, 64, Canadian politician, MP (1949–1958).
- Jana Černá, 52, Czech poet and writer, traffic collision.
- Sir Neill Cooper-Key, 73, British politician, MP (1945–1970).
- Lanza del Vasto, 79, Italian poet and activist.
- Joe Dolhon, 53, American basketball player, traffic collision.
- Walter Feistritzer, 60, Austrian ice hockey player.
- Johnnella Frazer Jackson, 84, American academic and musician.
- Sir James Martin, 87, British engineer (Martin-Baker).
- Knut Nordholm, 78, Swedish Olympic fencer (1936).
- Frederick Osborn, 91, American general and eugenicist.
- Guy Paquinet, 77, French jazz trombonist.
- Norm Standlee, 61, American football player.
- Ahmad Toukan, 77, Jordanian politician, prime minister (1970).
- Harold Urey, 87, American chemist, Nobel Prize recipient (1934), heart attack.
- Fritz Walter, 80, German football executive.
- Leopold Wohlrab, 68, Austrian Olympic handball player (1936).

=== 6 ===
- Bert Avery, 73, Australian footballer.
- Ernestine Bowes-Lyon, 89, Scottish noble.
- A. J. Cronin, 84, Scottish novelis (The Citadel, The Stars Look Down, The Keys of the Kingdom).
- Edward Arunah Dunlop Jr., 61, Canadian politician, esophageal cancer.
- Tom Litterick, 51, British politician, MP (1974–1979).
- Leo J. Martin, 59, American Olympic bobsledder (1948).
- Larry Neal, 43, American poet and academic, heart attack.
- Viljo Pousi, 62, Finnish politician, MP (1966–1970).
- Wesley Powell, 65, American politician, governor of New Hampshire (1959–1963).
- Cassy Ryan, 75, American football player.
- Fred Stiely, 79, American baseball player.
- Ladislav Štoll, 78, Czech politician.
- Antonio Suárez, 48, Spanish racing cyclist.

=== 7 ===
- José Ardévol, 69, Cuban composer.
- Brigitte Bodenheimer, 68, German-American jurist.
- Antonio Castro Leal, 84, Mexican diplomat and politician.
- Dorothy Detzer, 87, American peace activist.
- Joan Elan, 52, English actress.
- Clarence I. Evenson, 90, American politician, member of the Minnesota House of Representatives (1959–1963).
- William Feather, 91, American publisher and writer.
- Charles W. Fisher, 84, American politician, member of the California State Assembly (1931–1937).
- Bagio Gavinelli, 82, Italian racing cyclist.
- Leo Gerner, 68, Liechtensteiner politician.
- Alvar Lidell, 72, English radio announcer and newsreader, cancer.
- Chink Martin, 94, American jazz musician.
- Sir Wilfred Morton, 74–75, Scottish civil servant.
- John Pascal, 48, American playwright (George M!) and screenwriter, lung cancer.
- Jan Przecherka, 58, Polish footballer.
- Eric Robinson, 51, Australian politician, MP (since 1972), heart attack.
- Andrew Denny Rodgers, III, 80, American botanist.
- Irv Stein, 69, American baseball player.
- Hugh M. Tiner, 72, American academic administrator.
- Florence Walton, 90–91, American vaudeville performer.

=== 8 ===
- Stymie Beard, 56, American actor (Our Gang), pneumonia.
- Woodrow Chambliss, 66, American actor (Gunsmoke), colon cancer.
- Réal Chevrefils, 48, Canadian ice hockey player.
- John H. Collins, 78, American classical scholar.
- Balfour Currie, 78, Canadian meteorologist.
- Shigeru Egami, 68, Japanese karate master.
- Sharif El-Far, 52, Egyptian footballer.
- Reg Evenden, 61, Australian footballer.
- Moritz Jagendorf, 92, Austrian-American folklorist.
- Mortimer von Kessel, 87, German general.
- Alexander Kotov, 67, Soviet chess grandmaster.
- Donald Lehman, 47, American murder victim, shot.
- Margarete Markl, 78, Austrian sculptor.
- Walter M. Nielsen, 80, American physicist.
- Jessie Rindom, 77, Danish actress.
- Philip H. Ross, 75, American naval admiral.
- Karel Schummelketel, 83, Dutch Olympic equestrian (1932).
- Sergio Varetto, 43, Italian Olympic sports shooter (1960), hepatitis.

=== 9 ===
- Donald H. Bochkay, 64, American flying ace.
- Ronald Brittain, 81, British soldier, voiceover artist and actor.
- Tommy Byrnes, 57, American basketball player.
- Norm Campbell, 61, Australian footballer.
- Sammy Davis, 94, British racing driver and journalist, house fire.
- John K. Gerhart, 73, American general, coronary thrombosis.
- Jeanne Judson, 92, American journalist and novelist.
- Désiré Koranyi, 66, Hungarian-French footballer.
- Vera McWeeney, 71, Irish field hockey and tennis player.
- Obdulio Morales, 70, Cuban musician.
- Charles Coudert Nast, 77, American general and lawyer.
- Jack Nielsen, 84, Norwegian tennis player.
- Hugo Pena, 29, Argentine footballer, electrocuted.
- Bjarne Rognlien, 89, Norwegian judge.
- Kazimierz Serocki, 58, Polish composer.

=== 10 ===
- Katharine Alexander, 83, American actress.
- Raffaello Bellucci, 76, Italian politician.
- Richard Boone, 63, American actor (Have Gun – Will Travel), throat cancer.
- Fawn M. Brodie, 65, American historian and biographer, cancer.
- Chink Crossin, 57, American basketball player.
- Paul Deichmann, 82, German general.
- Kaare Engstad, 74, Canadian Olympic skier (1932).
- Carl Feaster, 50, American musician (The Chords) and singer ("Sh-Boom").
- Lena Beatrice Morton, 79, American literary scholar.
- Charlotte Mühe, 70, German Olympic swimmer (1928).
- H. Warner Munn, 77, American fiction writer.
- Athol Murray, 79, English cricketer.
- Jacob Slagle, 77, American football player.
- Tom Wright, 78, Scottish-born Australian trade unionist.

=== 11 ===
- Artur Berger, 88, Austrian-Soviet set designer.
- Beulah Bondi, 92, American actress (The Gorgeous Hussy, Of Human Hearts, It's a Wonderful Life), complications from a fall.
- Thomas "Bang Bang" Dudley, 74, Irish prankster.
- Wilhelm Haas, 84, German diplomat.
- Desiderius Hampel, 85, German general.
- Hubert Hunt, 82, British flying ace.
- Dmitry Leonov, 81, Soviet general.
- Malcolm MacDonald, 79, British politician, diplomat and colonial administrator.
- George A. Palmer, 85, American clergyman and radio broadcaster.
- Fred Perry, 77, British Olympic boxer (1928).
- Sinclair Traill, 75–76, British publisher and jazz critic.
- Veikko Vartiainen, 67, Finnish Olympic equestrian (1948, 1952).
- Kenneth W. Wolfe, 72, American politician.

=== 12 ===
- Clem Crabtree, 62, American football player.
- Ada Dietz, 92, American weaver and mathematician.
- John Francis Dooling Jr., 72, American jurist, heart attack.
- Isobel Elsom, 87, English actress, heart failure.
- Marcel Gobillot, 81, French racing cyclist.
- Fred Goding, 75, Australian footballer.
- Florence Ann Humphries, 65, New Zealand trade unionist.
- Nathan Katz, 88, French poet.
- Sir John Nicoll, 81, British colonial administrator, governor of Singapore (1952–1955).
- Sergio Salinas, 53, Chilean politician.
- Wladimir Seidel, 73, Russian-born German-American mathematician.
- Joseph Sparks, 79, British politician and trade unionist, MP (1945–1959).
- Diki Tsering, c. 79–80, Tibetan writer, mother of the 14th Dalai Lama.
- Don Whitehead, 72, American journalist, lung cancer.

=== 13 ===
- Herbert Henry Farmer, 88, British academic and minister.
- Finn Olav Gundelach, 55, Danish diplomat, vice-president of the European Commission (since 1977), heart attack.
- David Hanna, 39, American artist, heart attack.
- Robert Kellard, 65, American actor, pneumonia.
- Walter Stewart Owen, 76, Canadian politician.
- Park Chong-hwa, 79, South Korean poet and novelist.
- Owen Harding Wangensteen, 82, American surgeon, inventor of the Wangensteen tube, heart attack.
- Leslie Ward, 72, English cricketer.

=== 14 ===
- William Barber, 74, English cricketer.
- José Caeiro, 55, Spanish football player and manager, heart attack.
- Romuald Adam Cebertowicz, 83, Polish hydrotechnician.
- Ben McPeek, 46, Canadian composer.
- Nashad, 57, Indian-Pakistani film composer.
- John O'Grady, 73, Australian author (They're a Weird Mob).
- Ēriks Rauska, 81, Latvian Olympic weightlifter (1924).
- George Skibine, 60, Russian-American ballet dancer and choreographer, pulmonary embolism.
- Lloyd Spencer, 87, American politician, member of the U.S. Senate (1941–1943).

=== 15 ===
- Emanuel Celler, 92, American politician, member (1923–1973) and dean (1965–1973) of the U.S. House of Representatives.
- Carl Hoppe, 83, American painter.
- Jean Hamilton Hubener, 76, Australian Germanist.
- David E. Lilienthal, 81, American public administrator and attorney, heart attack.
- Doug Livingstone, 82, Scottish football player and manager.
- Devaneya Pavanar, 78, Indian etymologist.
- Zeno Saltini, 80, Italian Roman Catholic priest, founder of the Nomadelfia movement, heart attack.
- Stephen Tall, 72, American science fiction writer.
- Graham Whitehead, 58, British racing driver.

=== 16 ===
- Jack Frendo Azzopardi, 65, Maltese Olympic water polo player (1936).
- Nikolaos Bourantas, 80–81, Greek politician and Nazi collaborator.
- John Oates Bower, 79, Canadian politician, MP (1965–1968).
- Ali Dara, 65, Pakistani field hockey player and manager.
- Gordon Delamont, 62, Canadian music educator.
- Ken Fowler, 73, American racing driver.
- Edwin Broun Fred, 93, American bacteriologist and academic administrator.
- René-Émile Godfroy, 96, French naval admiral.
- Birger Haug, 72, Norwegian Olympic high jumper (1932).
- Maurice Kyle, 43, English footballer.
- Bernard Lee, 73, English actor (Dr. No, The Third Man, Goldfinger), stomach cancer.
- Archibald Motley, 89, American artist.
- Hedda Nova, 81, Russian-born American actress.
- Lady Delia Peel, 91, English courtier.
- Ernest Gerard Wright, 79, Australian politician.
- Leo C. Young, 90, American radio engineer.

=== 17 ===
- Lyman E. Abbott, 68, American football and basketball coach.
- Hugo Aufderbeck, 71, German theologian, cancer.
- Euston Baker, 85, British soldier.
- Gunnar Bech, 60, Danish linguist.
- Mack Gray, 75, American actor.
- Sir Thomas Hutton, 90, British general.
- Ilmari Kuokka, 79, Finnish Olympic runner (1928).
- Walter G. McGahan, 78, American lawyer and politician.
- Timo Murama, 67, Finnish Olympic skier (1936).
- Marguerite Oswald, 73, American receptionist and conspiracy theorist, cancer.
- Loukas Panourgias, 81, Greek footballer.
- David Rank, 74, American spectroscopist and academic administrator.
- Charles de Tolnay, 81, Hungarian art historian.

=== 18 ===
- Sir David Stirling Anderson, 85, Scottish engineer and educator.
- Françoise Bujold, 47, Canadian poet and artist, cancer.
- Antoinette Cellier, 67, English actress.
- Mary Hawton, 56, Australian tennis player.
- Sir Arthur Hutchinson, 84, British civil servant.
- Manuel Perez, 66, American animator (Looney Tunes, Fritz the Cat, The Lord of the Rings).
- William P. Robinson Sr., 69, American politician, member of the Virginia House of Delegates (since 1970), bone cancer.
- Rudolf Schrader, 105, German-born American Olympic gymnast (1904).
- Philip Edward Tovrea Jr., 60, American flying ace.
- Richard L. Wilson, 75, American journalist, mycosis fungoides.

=== 19 ===
- Sir Harold Black, 66, Northern Irish civil servant.
- Eric Boon, 61, British boxer, heart attack.
- Price Daniel Jr., 39, American politician, member of the Texas House of Representatives (1969–1975), shot.
- Joseph R. Fisher, 59, American soldier, heart attack.
- Desmond Fitzmaurice, 63, Australian cricketer.
- Alberto Héber Usher, 62, Uruguayan politician.
- Charles Hampton Johnston, 61, Scottish politician.
- Thomas Moon, 81, English footballer.
- Gordon Russell, 51, American screenwriter, cancer.
- Francesca Woodman, 22, American photographer, suicide by jumping.

=== 20 ===
- Benny Berthet, 70, American-born French tennis player and coach.
- George Brownrigg, 84, Irish cricketer.
- Margaret Dobson, 92, American artist.
- Richard Frydenlund, 89, Norwegian Olympic wrestler (1912, 1920).
- Robert M. Graham, 83, American politician.
- Derick Heathcoat-Amory, 1st Viscount Amory, 81, British politician, MP (1945–1960) and member of the House of Lords (since 1960).
- Hella Katz, 81, Austrian-English photographer.
- Charles E. Kelly, 78, Irish cartoonist.
- Ernest Kruskopf, 61, New Zealand cricketer.
- Johnny Paul, 81, Scottish footballer.
- H. H. Pearson, 67, Australian surgeon.
- Vittorio Tamagnini, 70, Italian Olympic boxer (1928).
- Wilopo, 71, Indonesian politician, prime minister (1952–1953).

=== 21 ===
- William Findlay, 77, Scottish-born American soccer player.
- Cuth Harrison, 74, British racing driver.
- B. T. Hopkins, 83, Welsh poet.
- Augusta Jawara, 56, Gambian women's rights activist and playwright.
- Allyn Joslyn, 79, American actor, heart failure.
- Richard Juckes, 79, English cricketer.
- Bishnuram Medhi, 92, Indian politician.
- Cyril Northam, 86, English footballer.
- Egon Pollak, 82, Austrian-American football player and manager.
- Russell Procope, 72, American jazz musician, heart attack.
- Bill Robinson, 73, Australian politician.
- James Stronge, 48, Northern Irish politician, shot.
- Sir Norman Stronge, 86, Northern Irish politician, shot.
- Charlie Usher, 89, Scottish rugby player.
- Ernst Wahle, 91, German archaeologist.

=== 22 ===
- Bob Abate, 87, Canadian sports coach.
- Franco Abbiati, 82, Italian musicologist.
- Jim Calvert, 63, Australian footballer.
- Blind James Campbell, 74, American blues musician.
- Augusta Kalloch Christie, 93, American politician, member of the Maine House of Representatives (1953–1961) and Senate (1961–1964).
- Rudolf Geiger, 86, German meteorologist.
- Harold Harrington, 77, American botanist.
- Bror Lagercrantz, 86, Swedish Olympic fencer (1924).
- Annie Major, 76, English politician.
- María Moliner, 80, Spanish lexicographer.
- Rudolph Nissen, 84, German surgeon.
- Ishtiaq Hussain Qureshi, 77, Pakistani historian and playwright.
- D. Neil Reid, 80, American politician, member of the Michigan House of Representatives (1947–1949).
- Augustyn Skórski, 44, Polish ice hockey player, traffic collision.
- Torgeir Svendsen, 70, Norwegian politician.
- Hugo van den Wall Bake, 67, Dutch admiral.
- Gladys Vasey, 91, British painter.
- Sir Arnold Waters, 94, British soldier and engineer.
- Russ Wilkins, 57, American basketball player.
- Hein Zielstra, 72, Dutch general.

=== 23 ===
- Jalal Baba, 79, Pakistani politician.
- Samuel Barber, 70, American composer (Adagio for Strings), cancer.
- Garnet Campbell, 77, Australian footballer.
- Nick DeMaggio, 90, American film editor.
- Martha Thomas Fitzgerald, 86, American politician and educator.
- Harold K. Hochschild, 88, American conservationist and philanthropist.
- Leonard Howell, 82, Jamaican Rastafari leader.
- Anthea Joseph, 56, British publisher, cancer.
- Vera Maslovskaya, 84, Belarusian-Polish educator.
- Roman Rudenko, 73, Soviet lawyer and politician, procurator general (since 1953).
- Maurice Schexnayder, 85, American Roman Catholic prelate.
- Bobby Sherwood, 66, American bandleader and radio host, cancer.
- Sir Andrew Shonfield, 63, British economist.
- Christopher Simcox, 71, English murderer.
- David Weyhe Smith, 54, American pediatrician, cancer.
- Olin E. Teague, 70, American politician, member of the U.S. House of Representatives (1946–1978), diabetes.
- Bill White, 65, Canadian politician and composer.
- Reginald Wightman, 81, Canadian politician.

=== 24 ===
- Orville Brown, 72, American professional wrestler.
- Elizabeth Frances Corbett, 93, American novelist.
- Suzanne de Dietrich, 89, French theologian.
- Peter Paul Fernandes, 64, Indian Olympic field hockey player (1936).
- Veikko Hänninen, 51, Finnish chess player.
- Karel František Koch, 90, Czech-Canadian doctor and humanitarian.
- Musette Majendie, 77, English philanthropist.
- Martha Betz Shapley, 90, American astronomer.

=== 25 ===
- Elbern Alkire, 73, American Hawaiian guitarist.
- Adele Astaire, 84, American actress, dancer and singer, stroke.
- Joseph Francel, 85, American executioner.
- Ladislav Grosman, 59, Slovak-Israeli novelist and screenwriter (The Shop on Main Street), heart attack.
- Joe Kuharich, 63, American football player and coach, heart attack.
- Nathan M. Newmark, 70, American structural engineer.
- Russell Perry, 65, Canadian politician.
- Lobsang Rampa, 70, English author (The Third Eye).
- Richard Talmadge, 88, German-born American actor, director and stuntman, cancer.
- Mario Zanello, 77, Italian football player and manager.

=== 26 ===
- Sir Jack Acland, 77, New Zealand politician.
- Constance Applebee, 107, English field hockey player.
- Jean De Schryver, 64, Belgian Olympic boxer (1936).
- Bob Johnson, 78, Australian footballer.
- Lucinda Sewer Millin, 88, Virgin Islander politician.
- Ray Oyler, 43, American baseball player, heart attack.
- Jenő Rácz, 73, Hungarian politician.
- Tracy Sonneborn, 75, American microbiologist.
- Reba Z. Whittle, 61, American nurse, cancer.

=== 27 ===
- Helmut Bertram, 70, German politician.
- Roger Burford, 76, English novelist and screenwriter.
- Julius Cheeks, 51, American gospel singer.
- Léo Collard, 78, Belgian politician.
- Brenda Colvin, 83, British landscape architect.
- Cecil Davidge, 79, British lawyer and academic.
- Spencer Davis, 72, American baseball player.
- Francis William Farrell, 80, American general.
- Huck Geary, 64, American baseball player.
- Tom Green, 67, Australian artist.
- Eupraxie Gurjanova, 79, Soviet biologist.
- Stretton Reeve, 73, British Anglican prelate.

=== 28 ===
- Özdemir Asaf, 57, Turkish poet.
- William Corson, 71, American actor.
- J. Wynn Fredericks, 81, American football player and coach.
- Alphonse Gemuseus, 82, Swiss Olympic equestrian (1924, 1928).
- John Gerber, 74, Russian-born American bridge player, heart attack.
- Harry Wagstaff Gribble, 84, British-American playwright and screenwriter.
- Gladys Nicholls, 74, Australian Aboriginal activist.
- Nikolay Pushkov, 77, Soviet geophysicist.
- Erwin Saxl, 76, Austrian-born American physicist.

=== 29 ===
- Jack A. W. Bennett, 69, New Zealand-born British literary scholar.
- Karl Ludvig Bugge, 78, Norwegian civil servant.
- Cozy Cole, 71, American jazz drummer, cancer.
- Adrien Courtois, 75, French Olympic racewalker (1936).
- Anne Elstner, 82, American actress (Stella Dallas), stroke.
- Brian Geary, 68, Australian footballer.
- John Glassco, 71, Canadian poet and novelist.
- Ole W. Grubb, 89, American politician, member of the Oregon House of Representatives (1957–1958).
- Kipp Hamilton, 46, American actress, breast cancer.
- John Cecil Kelly-Rogers, 75, British aviator.
- Lajos Korányi, 73, Hungarian footballer.
- Vernon Stewart Laurie, 84, British stockbroker and soldier.
- Reginald Martin, 93, British Olympic lacrosse player (1908).
- Lillian Ward McDaniel, 78, American educator.
- Jean-Baptiste Mockey, 65, Ivorian politician.
- Rafael Lucas Rodríguez, 65, Costa Rican biologist.

=== 30 ===
- Gerald J. Boileau, 81, American politician and jurist, member of the U.S. House of Representatives (1931–1939).
- Viggo Dibbern, 80, Danish Olympic gymnast (1920).
- Reg Gisborn, 68, Canadian politician.
- John Gordon, 68, Irish Roman Catholic prelate.
- Theodor Haltenorth, 70, German zoologist.
- John E. Miller, 92, American politician and jurist, member of the U.S. House of Representatives (1931–1937) and Senate (1937–1941).
- James F. Moriarty, 84, American general.
- Bruce Murray, 47, Australian footballer.
- Park Hyun-sook, 84, South Korean politician.
- Marino Pieretti, 60, Italian-born American baseball player, cancer.
- Elias Wessén, 91, Swedish linguist.

=== 31 ===
- Jacques Bordeneuve, 72, French politician.
- François Boux de Casson, 72, French politician.
- Josef Dobiáš, 94, Czech chess player.
- Dick Edwards, 50, American basketball coach.
- Werner Ehrig, 83, German general.
- Emil Flecken, 91, German painter.
- William Gopallawa, 84, Sri Lankan politician, president (1972–1978) and governor-general of Ceylon (1962–1972), heart attack.
- Mel Holden, 26, Scottish footballer, amyotrophic lateral sclerosis.
- Pat Mehaffy, 76, American jurist.
- Gaby Tanguy, 51, French Olympic swimmer (1952).
- Thomas Webster, 70, American Olympic sailor (1932).
- Joseph W. Willard, 63, Canadian civil servant.
- Scotty Wiseman, 71, American country singer, heart attack.
- Max Woiski Sr., 69, Surinamese musician.
