= Fritz Walter (disambiguation) =

Fritz Walter (1920–2002) was a German football player and 1954 World Cup-winning captain.

Fritz Walter may also refer to:

- Fritz-Walter-Stadion, a stadium in Kaiserslautern named after the above
- Fritz Walter (footballer, born 1960), German player, played in 1980s and 1990s
- Fritz Walter (politician) (1896–1977), German politician of the FDP
- Fritz Walter (football executive) (1900–1981), chairman of VfB Stuttgart
- Friedrich Walter (1924–1980), Australia ice hockey player
