= Evenden =

Evenden is a surname. Notable people with the surname include:

- Charles Evenden (1894–1961), British cartoonist and author;
- Don Evenden (1931–2018), Australian rugby league footballer;
- Reg Evenden (1919–1981), Australian rules footballer.

== See also ==
- Evensen
