= Neil Reid (disambiguation) =

Neil Reid (born 1959) is a Scottish former child singing star.

Neil Reid may also refer to:

- D. Neil Reid (1900–1981), American politician
- Neil E. Reid (1871–1956), American jurist
- Neil Reid (album), a 1972 album by Neil Reid

== See also ==
- Neel Reid (1885–1926), American architect
- Neil Reidman (born 1970s), British actor
- Neil Reed, American basketball player
