= Trčka =

Trčka (feminine: Trčková) is a Czech surname. Notable people with the surname include:

- Adam Erdmann Trčka von Lípa (1599–1634), Bohemian nobleman and lieutenant field marshal of the Thirty Years' War
- Aleš Trčka (born 1961), Czech cyclist
- Anton Josef Trčka (1893–1940), Austrian-born Czech poet and photographer
- Dominik Trcka (1886–1959), Czech Catholic theologist and martyr
- Jayne Trcka (1963–2025), American bodybuilder and actress
- Lenny Trčková, Czech TV presenter
- Martin Trčka (born 1977), Czech Olympic sailor
