= Ellinor Tordis =

Austrian dancer (1895–1973)

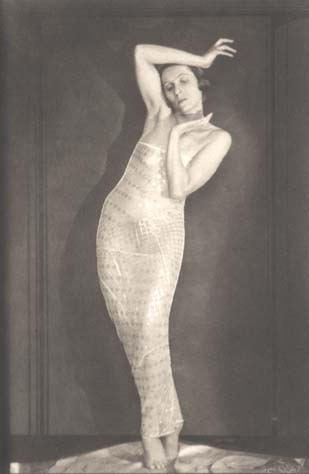
- Ellinor Tordis, photographed by Anton Josef Trčka in 1926.

Ellinor Tordis, pseudonym of Ellinor Wachsmuth (1895–1973) was an Austrian dancer and dance educator in Vienna in the 1920s.

== Early life ==
Tordis was born in 1895 in Dresden.

== Career ==
Tordis danced as a member of the Münchener Tanz-Drei, and ran a school in Vienna, focused on movement ideas from modern dance and gymnastics. Among her students were dancers Gisela Taglicht and Hans Wiener (Jan Veen), and actress Vilma Degischer. Her accompanist for a time was pianist and dancer Gertrud Kraus, and Anne Winter headed the gymnastics department.

Tordis was a proponent of coordinated mass gymnastics, or Bewegungschöre, as positive expressions of social unity and public health. She and her group performed at the Festival of Music and Theatre in Vienna in 1924.

== Personal life ==
Tordis died on April 3, 1973, in Vienna. She was buried at the Vienna Central Cemetery on April 12, 1973.
