= Gavinelli =

Gavinelli is an Italian surname. Notable people with the surname include:

- Bagio Gavinelli (1898–1981), Italian cyclist
- Rodolfo Gavinelli (1891–1921), Italian footballer
