= Evensen =

Evensen is a surname. Notable people with the surname include:

- Alfred Evensen (1883–1942), Norwegian musician
- Andreas Evensen (born 1986), Norwegian boxer
- Andrias Christian Evensen (1874–1917), Faroese priest, editor, writer, and politician
- Bernt Evensen (1905–1979), Norwegian speed skater and racing cyclist
- Carl Julius Evensen (1851–1937), Norwegian shipmaster and explorer
- Dan Evensen (born 1974), Norwegian mixed martial artist and kickboxer
- Erling Evensen (1914–1998), Norwegian cross-country skier
- Frank Evensen (born 1962), Norwegian judoka
- Henrik Evensen (born 1994), Norwegian cyclist
- Jens Evensen (1917–2004), Norwegian lawyer, judge, and politician
- Johan Remen Evensen (born 1985), Norwegian ski jumper
- Lars Evensen (1896–1969), Norwegian trade unionist and politician
- Per Egil Evensen (born 1950), Norwegian politician
- Robert Evensen (born 1982), Norwegian footballer
- Svend Evensen (1880–?), Norwegian judge
- Tidemann Flaata Evensen (1905–1969), Norwegian politician
- Vidar Evensen (born 1971), Norwegian footballer
- Willy Evensen (1919–1997), Norwegian rower
