= Juckes =

Juckes is a surname. Notable people with the surname include:

- Bing Juckes (1926–1990), Canadian ice hockey player
- Gordon Juckes (1914–1994), Canadian ice hockey administrator
- Richard Juckes (1902–1981), British cricketer
- Robert Juckes Clifton (1826–1869), British politician
