= Głowno =

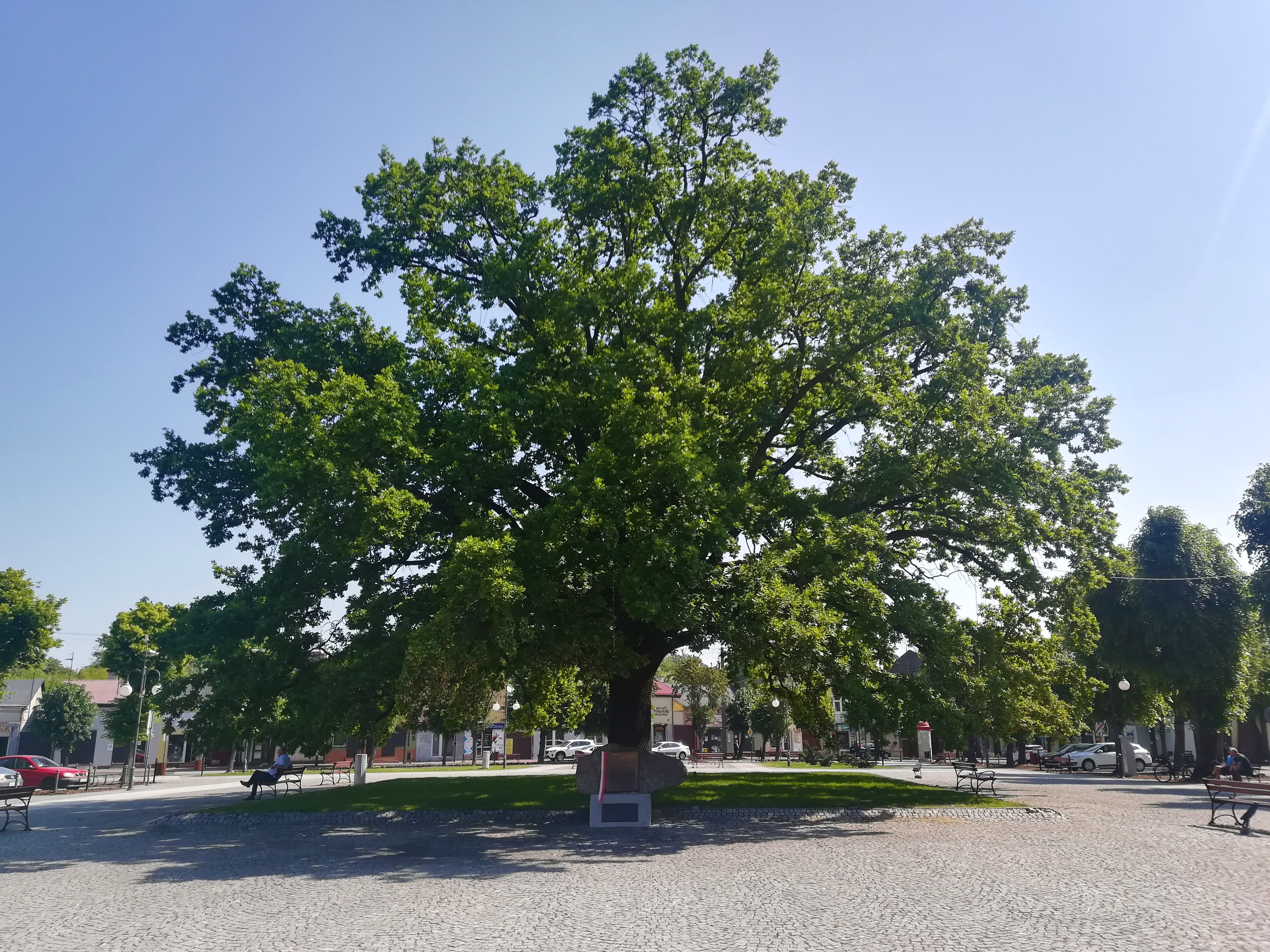
- Freedom Oak at the Freedom Square

- Flag Coat of arms

- Location within Poland
- Coordinates: 51°57′51″N 19°42′42″E
- Country: Poland
- Voivodeship: Łódź
- County: Zgierz
- Gmina: Głowno (urban gmina)
- Established: 15th century
- Town rights: 1427-1869, 1925

Government
  - Mayor: Grzegorz Janeczek

Area
  - Total: 19.82 km^{2} (7.65 sq mi)

Population (31 December 2020)
  - Total: 13,961 ▼
  - Density: 704.4/km^{2} (1,824/sq mi)
- Time zone: UTC+1 (CET)
  - Summer (DST): UTC+2 (CEST)
- Postal code: 95-015
- Area code: +48 42
- Car plates: EZG
- Website: http://glowno.pl

Głowno [ˈɡwɔvnɔ] is a town and community in Poland, in Łódź Voivodeship, in Zgierz County, about 25 km (16 mi) northeast of Łódź. The town administratively belonged to the Łódź Voivodeship from 1975 to 1998. According to data from 2020, the city had 13,961 inhabitants.

== History ==
Although the first settlement at the site of present-day Głowno is thought to have appeared in the 11th century, the first town was organized in the early 15th century near a trade route from the Duchy of Masovia, a Polish fief, to the Polish Kingdom. Rawa Mazowiecka feudal lord and Sochaczew podczaszy (deputy cup-bearer) Jakub Głowiński founded Głowno's first Roman Catholic church, which was consecrated on March 11, 1420 as the Church of St. Jacob. On Jakub's request, Duke Siemowit V of Masovia granted city rights under Kulm law. The city rights have been maintained until the modern day, with an interruption between the years 1870–1925.

Upon incorporation of the Duchy of Rawa into the Kingdom of Poland as a reverted fief in 1462 the Rawa Voivodeship was established, which was also part of the larger Greater Poland Province of the Polish Crown. Głowno belonged to that voivodeship until 1793 or the Second Partition of Poland. In 1504 a fire destroyed a large part of the city, whereupon King Alexander Jagiellon suspended taxation for its inhabitants for ten years. In 1522 second fire struck and King Sigismund I the Old granted another 10 year taxation reprieve. Because of the Deluge and the rebellion under Jerzy Sebastian Lubomirski, the population severely diminished, and in 1676, only 74 people lived in Głowno, but under the rule of King John III Sobieski the town population recovered somewhat. During the Great Northern War the town and church were ransacked by Saxon and Swedish troops, including a short but devastating stay by king Charles XI of Sweden and his mounted troops in 1704, recorded by the parish priest of the Saint Jacob church. Consequently, in 1710, an epidemic struck, killing inhabitants from local nobility to town peoples, and town was almost finished. Finally the city was sold to Baltazar Ciecierski, stolnik of Drohiczyn. After the 1730s and perhaps closer to 1750, the new owner started settling Jews there, in order to create income from textile industry. In 1741 King Augustus III of Poland granted market privileges to Ciecierski's town, allowing the town to hold four annual fairs during a calendar year. In 1775 there were 60 tax paying households in the town.

=== 1793-1939 ===
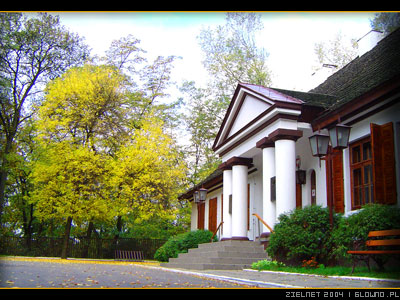
Built in 1840, Zabrzeźnia manor was last owned by Count Aleksandra Komorowska

In 1793, the Second Partition of Poland took place, whereby the city was taken over by Prussia. With the resurgence of Polish statehood and establishment of the Duchy of Warsaw in 1806, the area was incorporated therein. In 1815, upon defeat of Napoleon town fell to the Russians and became part of the newly formed Congress Poland.

In 1869, Russian occupying authorities took away Głowno's town rights, a strong punitive measure intended as a humiliation for its citizens' participation in the January Uprising. In 1870, Czar Alexander II of Russia downgraded a large number of Polish towns to villages in all of Polish territories under Russian administration, and Głowno suffered the same fate.

In 1903, the railway connection between Warsaw and Łódź was built through Głowno, therewith representing a positive factor for the economy. The first volunteer fire department was formed in 1908. In 1924, the "Buch and Werner Norblin Brothers" company opened a factory branch in Głowno. Upon resurrection of the Polish Republic in 1918, the new Polish government reestablished the lost city status and rights in 1925.

=== World War II ===
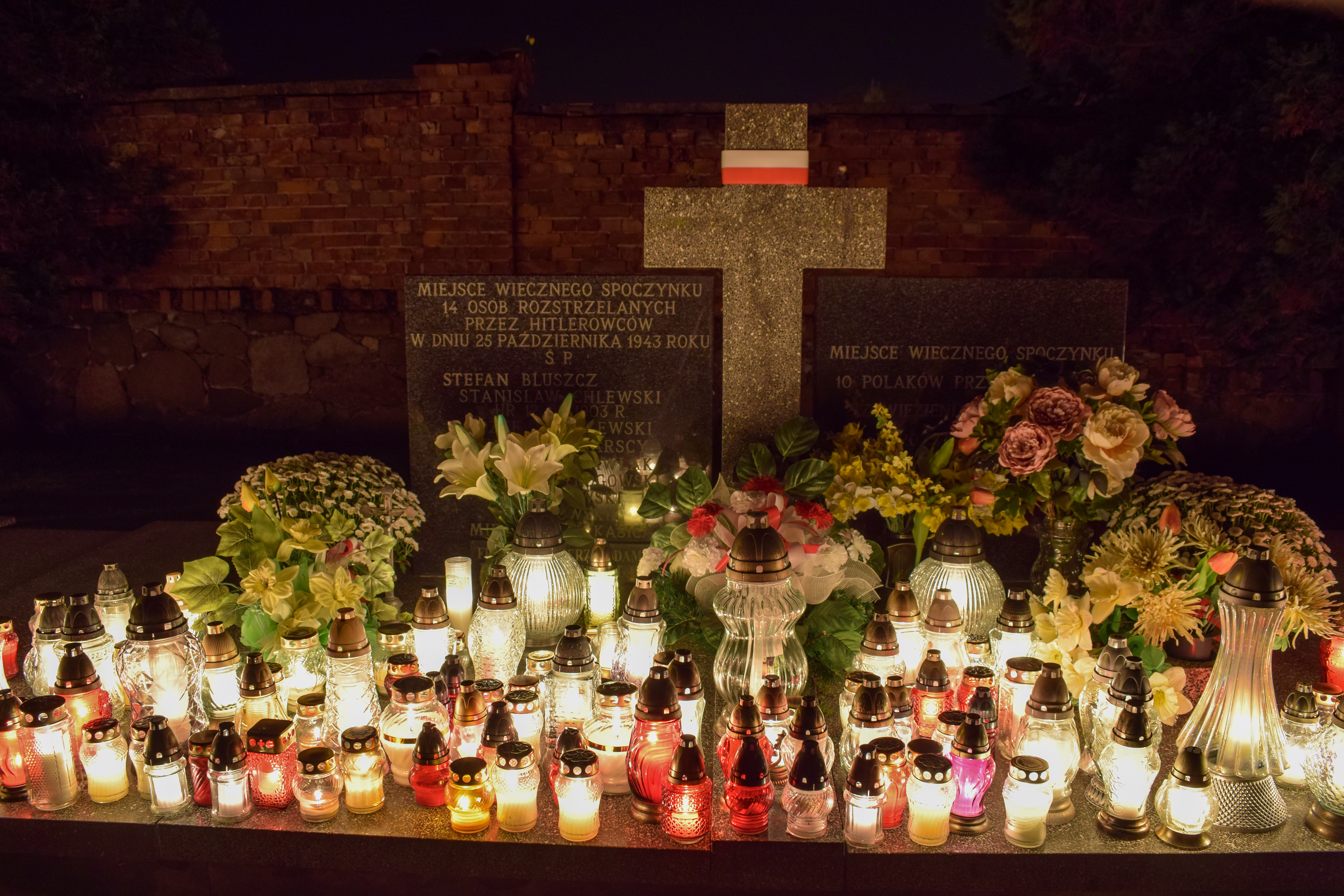
Mass grave of 24 Poles murdered by the Germans in two mass executions in 1943 and 1944

With the outbreak of World War II on September 1, 1939, the area was a scene of the Battle of Bzura and some fighting occurred in Głowno vicinity. The town was overrun by the German Wehrmacht during the second week of September. Nazi German administration was established and Głowno became part of German administrative unit known as General Government. During the occupation numerous acts of Polish resistance, Armia Krajowa etc., occurred in Głowno including the clandestine execution of a Roman Catholic priest who worked as an informant for the Nazi police. Nazi reprisals took the lives of many citizens, including those murdered in mass executions at the town's cemetery and inside the town's German police headquarters and also in the Nazi occupied Warsaw's infamous prison Pawiak. Many citizens were forced into slave labor for the Germans and some were shipped to various factories and farms across Germany.

The German authorities established a Jewish ghetto in Głowno in May 1940, in order to confine its Jewish population for the purpose of persecution and exploitation. The ghetto was liquidated in March 1941, when all its 5,600 inhabitants were transported in cattle trucks to Łowicz and from there to the Warsaw Ghetto, the largest ghetto in all of Nazi occupied Europe with over 400,000 Jews crammed into an area of 1.3 square miles (3.4 km^{2}), or 7.2 persons per room. By the time Nazi-occupied Poland was liberated, not a single Jewish ghetto remained on Polish lands.

In August 1943 and March 1944, the Germans carried out two massacres of 14 and 10 Poles, respectively. During the Warsaw Uprising, in August 1944, the Germans deported 3,000 Varsovians from the Dulag 121 in Pruszków in Pruszków, where they were initially imprisoned, to Głowno. These Poles were mainly old people and women with children, many were sent to nearby villages, while over 1,000 stayed in the town and gmina as of mid-November 1944.

Soviet Red Army took Głowno in January 1945, and it was then restored to Poland, however with a Soviet-installed communist regime, which then stayed in power until the Fall of Communism in the 1980s.

=== Post-1945 ===
There was anti-communist resistance, by the cursed soldiers, in and around the town. After the war many factories have been built in town, as the population expanded schools have been built and generally town prospered until the crisis of the 1980s when along with the rest of the country town and its inhabitants suffered serious economic hardships and curtailed civil rights and freedoms, many of the numerous workers being members of the Solidarity Movement. In the 1990s, under the Third Polish Republic, town and the inhabitants at first prospered, however plagued by quality of life crimes, especially its textile and automotive factories and manufactures were expanding, but this boom suffered collapse by the end of the decade, most of the textile manufacturing in bankruptcy and factories facing closures etc. Since the joining of the European Union by Poland, many town inhabitants left in search of better life in nearby capital city of Warsaw and Poznań, and especially large migration has been witnessed to the United Kingdom, since 2010 to Germany and some to Italy, and town's population decreased.

== Geography ==
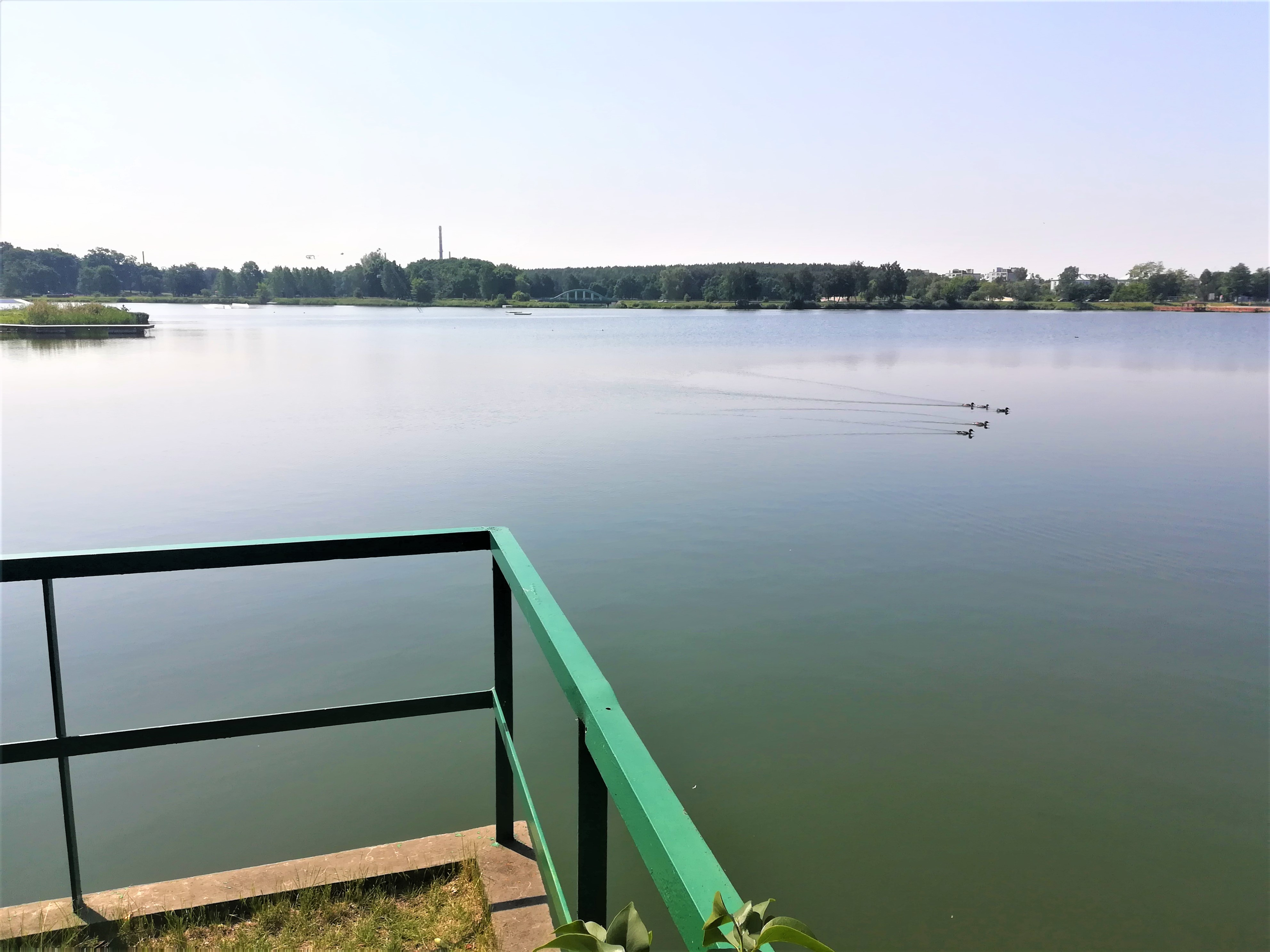
Mrożyczka Lake

Głowno is located in the Central Polish Lowlands (Nizina Polska), within the smaller geographical area of Łowicz-Błońska Plain at the confluence of three small rivers: Mroga, Mrożyca, and Brzuśnia. There are two dammed lakes with the total area of around 39 hectares, both fed by the waters of Mroga River. The city's elevation is from 119.3 to 145.9 meters, the higher number belongs to the northern part of the town, above sea level. The valleys of Mroga and Mrożyca form a natural, ecological contour of Głowno. The town area is a rather flat surface, and only the edges of the river valleys and a small chain of sand dunes in the center of the town (known as Marakan) form any variation in otherwise flat landscape. The land area of Głowno consists of 1,867 hectares, or 18.67 square kilometers. Town is located 29 kilometers northeast of Łódź and about 100 kilometers southwest of the Polish capital, Warsaw. According to 2002 data, Głowno has a surface area of 19.82 square kilometers, including 35% rural and 30% forested. The city comprises 2.32% surface of the administrative district.

=== Climate and nature ===
Głowno is surrounded by forests of pine, oak, birch, and fir. They are the remainder of the forests that formerly grew in the region of Łódź. They cover the area of the valley of the village of Olszowa. The northern forested part of Głowno has been declared as the Zabrzeźnia Reserve. The total area is 27.6 hectares. In the field of the reserve grows an oak-hornbeam forest. In Głowno, fir and beech are the main objects of preservation for the Zabrzeźnia Reserve. The northern limit of the occurrence of this tree crosses through here. The forested valley of three rivers form a unique microclimate around the region of Głowno.

The yearly air temperature averages 7.5C, in the summer +10C, in the winter - 2.5C. The annual amount of rainfall varies around 500 millimeters.

== Economy ==
Głowno was the center of the engine industry until quite lately (including, among others, the Military Motor Plant, the Ponar-Łódź Grinder Factory, Urządeń WUTECH Technical Plant, the "Chojaczki" Agricultural Repair Plant); but presently, mainly corsetry, textiles and lingerie. The JanMor yacht shipyard of the Łódź Voivodeship is located in Głowno.

== Points of interest ==
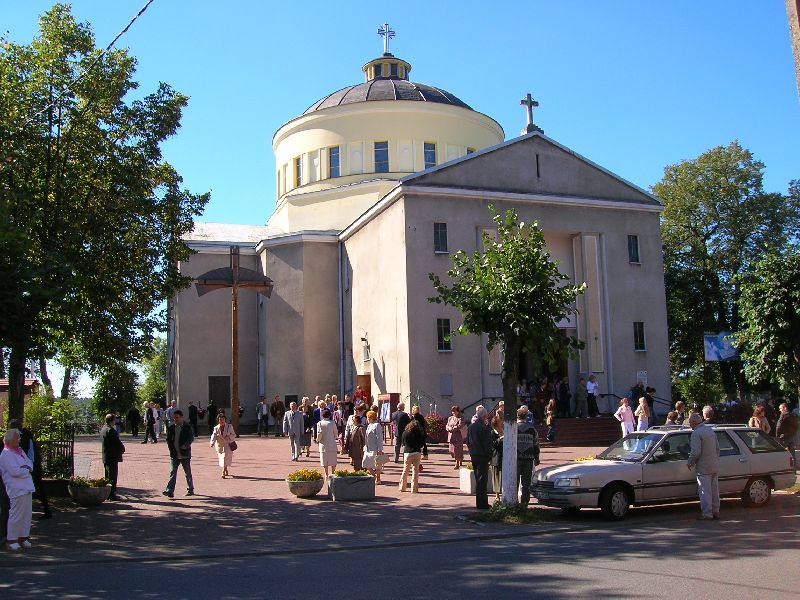
St. Jacobs church in Głowno

- Freedom Oak on Freedom Square - planted on November 11, 1928, on the tenth anniversary of the restoration of independence. Presently, the oak is a legally protected natural monument.
- Estate of Countess Aleksandra Komorowska from the end of the 19th century
- Polskie Koleje Państwowe (Polish State Railway) station
- Apartment houses on Freedom Square from the turn of the 19th-20th centuries
- Regional Museum of Głowno

== Districts of Głowno ==
Głowno is divided into districts, including Osiny, Huta Józefów, Borówka-Otwock, Kopernika, Zabrzeźnia, Cichorajka, Zakopane and Swoboda.

== Sports ==
The local football team is Stal Głowno. It competes in the lower leagues.

== Notable people ==
- Zbigniew Bródka, Polish speed skater, was born in Głowno

== Honorary citizens ==
- In 2004, honorary citizenship was granted posthumously to General Tadeusz Bór-Komorowski
- Prof. Romuald Adam Cebertowicz, honorary citizenship granted on November 24, 2003
- Tadeusz Bór-Komorowski, honorary citizenship granted on April 28, 2004
- Pope John Paul II, honorary citizenship granted on October 27, 2004

== Twin towns — Sister cities ==
Głowno is twinned with:

- Remptendorf, Germany
