= Owen Harding Wangensteen =

American surgeon and historian

- Born: September 21, 1898; Lake Park, Minnesota, United States
- Died: January 13, 1981 (aged 82); Minneapolis, Minnesota, United States
- Education: University of Minnesota
- Known for: Wangensteen suction
- Medical career
- Profession: Surgeon

Owen Harding Wangensteen (September 21, 1898 – January 13, 1981) was an American surgeon who developed the Wangensteen tube, which used suction to treat small bowel obstruction, an innovation estimated to have saved a million lives by the time of his death. He founded the Surgical Forum at the American College of Surgeons (ACS) and was renowned for his surgical teaching. Amongst his most notable students were Walton Lillehei, Christiaan Barnard, K. Alvin Merendino, Norman Shumway and Edward Eaton Mason. He made contributions to surgical practices in other areas, including appendicitis, peptic ulcers and particularly gastric cancer. In his later life, he showed a keen interest in the history of medicine and co-wrote a number of books on the subject with his wife.

== Early life ==
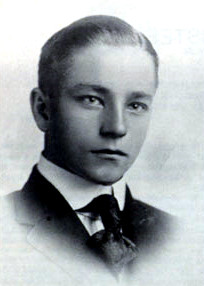
Wangensteen on his graduation from the University of Minnesota, 1919.

Owen Harding Wangensteen was born in 1898 to Ove Wangensteen and his wife Hannah and brought up on the family farm in Lake Park, Minnesota. His parents were Norwegian-immigrant farmers and he spent his early years working on the farm. He was the second of four siblings, having an older brother Charles, a younger sister Marian, and a younger brother Theodore; all were born at home.

As a child, Wangensteen had aspired to become a farmer, but two events led him to change his mind. After the veterinary physician recommended the slaughter of the family's 30 sows that could not farrow, Wangensteen missed three weeks of school to deliver over 300 piglets by manually extracting them. In addition, he once spent a hot summer hauling manure, and later was recalled telling his story about how his quest to study medicine arose "through the portals of pigs and manure."

Encouraged by his father, Wangensteen attended the University of Minnesota where he obtained his BA, MB, MD, and PhD degrees. His PhD thesis was completed at the University of Minnesota in 1925 on the subject of "The undescended testicle: an experimental and clinical study". He completed his surgical training at the University of Minnesota Hospitals.

Wangensteen's mother died from complications of tuberculosis. He was a surgical fellow when his father died. Owen and his elder brother, a lawyer, then supported the younger two.

== Career ==
Wangensteen was top of his class when he graduated from medical school in 1921. He spent his internship at the Elliot Hospital at the University of Minnesota, followed by a year-long surgical fellowship at the Mayo Clinic under Henry S. Plummer and William J. Mayo. As was common at that time, he pursued further surgical studies in Western Europe. The Dean, Elias P. Lyon, directed him to Bern, Switzerland where he trained under Professor Fritz de Quervain, who had succeeded the Nobel Laureate Theodor Kocher as professor of surgery. Wangensteen was also able to spend time with Professor Leon Asher at the Physiological Institute in Bern, learning research techniques in basic science. His time there taught him the value of historical perspective and the need to question, a philosophy which he would develop into the Socratic method as applied to surgery. After returning to Minnesota he received a promotion from instructor to assistant professor in 1926 at the University of Minnesota.

He was appointed chairman of the Department of Surgery in the University of Minnesota in 1930 when he was 32 and was promoted to full professorship the next year. He served as departmental chair until his retirement in 1967, and was succeeded by John Najarian.

=== Intestinal obstruction ===
In the 1930s, Wangensteen attended to numerous cases of small bowel intestinal obstruction. In around 80% of cases adhesions resulting from previous abdominal operations were the cause of the obstruction. These could often present months to years after the original operation. The standard treatment was to divide the adhesions with further surgery and create a temporary enterostomy. When, as was usually the case, this was performed as an emergency, many patients died.

By 1932, Wangensteen reported that suction via a nasogastric tube was as successful in relieving distension as surgical decompression. A year earlier, he tested and proved on an animal model, the hypothesis that it was swallowed air that caused the gaseous distension in the obstructed intestines. He argued that a tube placed into the stomach to remove the swallowed air in the stomach before it entered the intestines, would be just as effective as enterostomy, but without the accompanying morbidity and mortality. He passed a tube through the nose of a very unwell 72-year-old lady who was admitted with acute intestinal obstruction. Once the tube reached the stomach, he attached a suction device to remove swallowed air and stomach liquid, relieving the distension and resulting in relief of pain. She had surgery to relieve the bowel obstruction and recovered. The technique became known as 'Wangensteen suction' and was introduced into surgical practice around the world. Studies demonstrated that the 44% mortality rate for patients treated for intestinal obstruction between 1917 and 1928 declined to 20% in the years 1927–1937.

The technique became, and remains, standard practice for the initial management of small bowel obstruction in the context of previous abdominal surgery. A major systematic review in 2008 demonstrated that the suction technique introduced by Wangensteen was successful in 65% to 81% of patients with small bowel obstruction without peritonitis, avoiding the need for surgery.

Maurice Visser estimated that by 1944 the technique had saved over 100,000 lives and by the time of Wangensteen's death in 1981, had saved over one million.

For this innovative work the Academy of Surgery awarded him one of the highest American surgical honours, the Samuel D. Gross prize.

Wangensteen continued work on prevention of intestinal obstruction. He was especially concerned that the powder on surgeon's gloves predisposed to the formation of adhesions. He warned glove manufacturers of its dangers and conveyed the importance of the removal of powders from surgical gloves. Subsequent animal studies and clinical studies confirmed Wangensteen's suspicions that powdered surgical gloves could lead to adhesion formation. The use of such gloves was banned in Germany, then in the UK and banned by the Food and Drugs Administration in the US from January 2017.

=== Teaching and training ===
Under Wangensteen's leadership the surgical training program at Minnesota gained a national and then an international reputation. He used the Socratic method of teaching, making his trainees enquire, question and engage in dialogue to find answers to some of the most challenging surgical problems of the day. He encouraged his trainees to observe and to trust their observations. His teaching ability earned him a Faculty Fellowship in his name, The Wangensteen Faculty Fellowship.

He was one of the first generation of full-time chairs of surgery in the US and was a pioneer of incorporating mandatory research into American surgical training programs. Much of the research which he supervised was in basic sciences and he became adept at raising funds to support these projects.

He remained chief of surgery at the University of Minnesota for 37 years and attracted many surgical trainees including international trainees. Many of these became pioneers themselves, particularly in the field of heart surgery. These included F. John Lewis who in 1952, led the team which performed the world's first successful open-heart surgery using hypothermia, C. Walton Lillihei who introduced the technique of cross-circulation for open heart surgery, Richard DeWall who introduced the bubble-oxygenator style heart-lung machine, and Frederick S. Cross who refined and popularized the rotating disk oxygenator. Two of Wangensteen's trainees pioneered the introduction of heart transplantation, Norman Shumway who developed the technique and Christiaan Barnard who performed the world's first heart transplant.

Wangensteen's commitment to surgical training was extended beyond Minnesota when in 1939 he founded the Society for University Surgeons. This allowed surgeons in training to present and discuss research results. It provided a forum where young surgeons could learn about the work of their peers in other institutions. This national society helped strengthen the scientific base of American clinical surgery.

His innovative ideas inevitably led to his being involved in dispute and controversy. On one occasion the university dean, Richard Scammon, recommended that Wangensteen be demoted or dismissed. Powerful backing from two of his early supporters Elias Potter Lyon, the former dean, and William J. Mayo prevented this from happening.

Richard F. Edlich described him as "the greatest surgical educator of the 20th century." The success of his teaching and training methods is demonstrated by the careers of his trainees. Of these 38 became the department chairs, 31 accepted positions as division heads of their departments, 72 were directors of training programs, 110 became full professors, and 18 had appointments as associate professors.

=== Surgical forum ===
Wangensteen was an active member of the American College of Surgeons (ACS) and served as its president between 1959 and 1960. In February 1947 he was instrumental in establishing the Surgical Forum at the annual meeting of the ACS. The aim of the forum was to "provide an opportunity to the younger surgical group for the presentation of the results of original clinical and experimental research". This brought together surgical trainees involved in research with one of the largest gatherings of surgeons in the world, encouraging communication and the sharing of ideas. Wangensteen hoped that it would also allow "a number of young, well trained surgeons their first opportunity of a hearing before a national surgery organization" and in that way improve their communication and presentation skills. All abstracts presented to the forum were, and still are, published in the Journal of the American College of Surgeons (JACS), so giving many young surgeons their first opportunity to have their research published. The forum abstracts are judged on the basis of their originality, contribution to knowledge, the quality of the methodology, and impact and the best win the Excellence in Research Award. The forum continues at each ACS annual meeting, now titled the Owen H. Wangensteen Scientific Forum.

=== Other contributions ===
Amongst Wangensteen's other contributions to surgery were practices in cancer surgery and the understanding of gastrointestinal tract disorders including appendicitis. Other procedures he developed included those for the treatment of gastric cancer and ulcers.

== Awards and honors ==
In 1966, the National Academy of Sciences elected Wangensteen as a member. In addition, the Royal College of Surgeons of England, the Royal College of Surgeons of Edinburgh and Royal College of Surgeons in Ireland all made him an honorary fellow. Other honorary memberships included that of the Norwegian Academy of Science and Letters, the Académie Nationale de Médecine, the International Society of Surgery, the International Academy of History of Medicine and the German Surgical Congress.

In addition to honorary doctorates, Wangensteen received numerous awards.

- 1935 – Samuel D. Gross Award and Medal of the Philadelphia Academy of Surgery
- 1941 – John Scott Award and Medal
- 1949 – Alvarenza Prize
- 1960 – Distinguished Service Award of the University of Minnesota
- 1961 – Passano Award
- 1968 – Lannelongue Medal of the French Academy of Surgery
- 1968 – The American Medical Association's "Distinguished Service Award"
- 1976 – The American Surgical Association's "Scientific Achievement Award"

== Later years and legacy ==
The suction technique for intestinal obstruction became so familiar to the general public that Ogden Nash, one of America's best-known entertaining poets who had experience of bowel surgery himself, incorporated it into a poem in 1951.

A transcript of a series of interviews between Wangensteen and Peter Olch was issued in 1973 as part of the National Library of Medicine Oral History Program. A festschrift was issued in his honour.

The suction tube was featured the 173rd episode of the popular television series M*A*S*H.

Wangensteen had a keen interest in the history of medicine and was active in supporting a historical library, a degree in the history of medicine. With his wife Sarah he co-authored a number of medical history books. This included a major history of surgery from its earliest days The Rise of Surgery: From Empiric Craft to Scientific Discipline, published in 1979 to critical acclaim. The Wangensteen Historical Library of Biology and Medicine is located at the University of Minnesota.

He was at home in Minneapolis when he died from a heart attack at the age of 82 years.

He and his first wife had a daughter, Mary, and two sons, Owen and Stephen. His second wife was named Sarah.

== Selected publications ==
- Intestinal Obstructions: Physiological, pathological and clinical considerations with emphasis on therapy, including description of operative procedures. Charles C. Thomas, Springfield, 1955.
- Cancer of the Esophagus and the Stomach. American Cancer Society, New York, 1956.
- "Some Highlights in the History of Amputation Reflecting Lessons in Wound Healing", Bulletin of the History of Medicine, Vol. 41 (1967). (With Sarah D. Wangensteen)
- Reflections on the Blalock Papers. 1968.
- "Letters from a surgeon in the Crimean War", Bulletin of the History of Medicine, Vol. 43 (1969). (With Sarah D. Wangensteen)
- Lister, his Books, and Evolvement of his Antiseptic Wound Practices. 1974. (With Sarah D. Wangensteen)
- Lester Reynold Dragstedt: October 2, 1893 – July 16, 1975. National Academy of Sciences, Washington, D.C., 1980. (With Sarah D. Wangensteen)
- The Rise of Surgery: From Empiric Craft to Scientific Discipline. University of Minnesota Press, Minneapolis, 1981. (With Sarah D. Wangensteen) ISBN 9780816608294
