= Andrew Denny Rodgers III =

American lawyer and botanist

Andrew Denny Rodgers III (January 19, 1900 – January 7, 1981), was a lawyer and botanist who was born and died in Ohio.

He graduated from Ohio Wesleyan University in 1922, and obtained an LL.B. degree from Ohio State University in 1925. He practiced law from 1926 to 1933, then undertook graduate study at Northwestern University from 1933 to 1935, and became a member of scientific organizations. He published articles in plant science and other journals. He became a serious student of the history of North American botany (and related fields), primarily of the later nineteenth century. In 1940 he published his first book, Noble Fellow. Noble Fellow was an extensive treatise on Rodgers' great-grandfather, bryologist William Starling Sullivant; it dealt with Sullivant's heritage and then followed with a thorough discourse on his life and times. In subsequent years he wrote and published six more books on North American botanical topics (see Books). His books received high praise from botanical professionals who reviewed them. Some examples:

Adolph E. Waller, in the Forward to Noble Fellow, wrote: "It is much more than a memoir of a distinguished ancestor. It seems that this biography with its wealth of Americana can be claimed the first attempt to bridge the gap between the recent past of our United States and the rapidly changing world in the fields of modern scientific research."

Conway Zirkle, in his review of Rodgers' book on John Torrey, wrote: "Mr. Rodgers tracks down his source material with rare skill, enormous energy, and, we can use no other word, gusto. He ferrets out forgotten or lost manuscripts, college and society records, family letters, anything that bears on his subject. The result is that his work is authoritative, detailed, and remarkably complete... This is one of the most satisfactory biographies to appear in recent years."

Albert F. Hill, reviewing Rodgers' Liberty Hyde Bailey, wrote "... no review can do it justice. It must be read to be appreciated-and read at one's leisure-in order to assimilate the wealth of material within its pages... it is a worthy successor to [Rodgers' earlier books], and carries the saga of North American botany another step nearer completion."

H. H. Chapman wrote of Rodgers' Bernard Edward Fernow: A story of North American Forestry "In completeness of coverage, fidelity to facts, and freedom from bias, this volume should rank as the most comprehensive and trustworthy history of the origin and development of forestry in the U. S. and Canada that has yet appeared... In a careful reading of the text, based on personal knowledge covering fifty years, the reviewer has not discovered any inaccuracies... This text is far more than a life of Dr. Fernow. Literally hundreds of persons are mentioned, with the part they played in forest history."

== Books ==
- Rodgers, Andrew Denny, III (1940, facsimile reprint 1968). Noble Fellow, William Starling Sullivant. New York: Hafner.
- Rodgers, Andrew Denny, III (1942, facsimile reprint 1965). John Torrey, A Story of North American Botany. New York: Hafner.
- Rodgers, Andrew Denny, III (1944). John Merle Coulter, Missionary in Science. Princeton, NJ: Princeton Univ. Press.
- Rodgers, Andrew Denny, III (1944, facsimile reprint 1968). American Botany, 1873-1892. New York: Hafner.
- Rodgers, Andrew Denny, III (1949, facsimile reprint 1965). Liberty Hyde Bailey, A Story of American Plant Sciences. New York: Hafner.
- Rodgers, Andrew Denny, III (1951, reprint 1991). Bernhard Eduard Fernow, A Story of North American Forestry. Durham, NC: Forest History Society.
- Rodgers, Andrew Denny, III (1952). Erwin Frink Smith, A Story of North American Plant Pathology (https://www.biodiversitylibrary.org/item/28277#page/11/mode/1up). Philadelphia: Amer. Philosophical Society. Retrieved Apr. 15, 2019.
