= Gisela Taglicht =

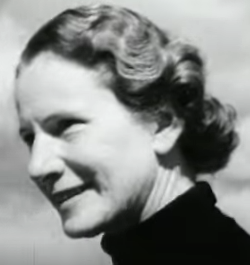
- Gisela Taglicht, from a 1948 documentary film made in New Zealand.
- Born: Gisela Frankl; 28 November 1898; Vienna, Austria
- Died: 1981 (aged 82–83); Salzburg, Austria
- Other names: Gisa Taglicht, Gisa Taglight, Gizette Taglicht, Gisette Taglicht

Gisela Taglicht (née Frankl; 28 November 1898 – 1981) was a notable New Zealand rhythmical dance and gymnastics teacher.

== Early life ==
Gisela Frankl was born in Vienna, Austria, in 1898, the daughter of Hermann Frankl and Malvine Neuner. Her parents were Jewish; her father was a tinsmith. She studied dance and movement with Ellinor Tordis and Bess Mensendieck. Her mother and sister were later killed at Auschwitz.

== Career ==
Taglicht assisted Ellinor Tordis at her Vienna dance studio in the 1920s. She left Austria fleeing Nazi persecution in 1938, going first to London, where she worked briefly as a domestic servant. In 1939 she moved to New Zealand with her younger brother's family. In 1941 she opened a rhythmic gymnastics studio in Wellington. From 1942 or 1943 to 1963, she was director of physical education at the YWCA in Wellington.

Taglicht also taught relaxation and breathing classes for pregnant women in the 1950s, and taught movement to actors and opera singers through programs of the New Zealand Drama Council, the New Zealand Players, and the New Zealand Opera Company. "From simple keep fit work to creative dance, rhythmical gymnastics covers a wide scope as to the need and ability of a person, and is easily adjusted to every age group," she explained to a New Zealand newspaper in 1948.

Gisa Taglicht was a fellow of the Physical Education Society of New Zealand from 1942, and became a naturalized citizen of New Zealand in 1946. A 1948 documentary, Rhythm and Movement, captured Taglicht's work on dance-inspired rhythmic fitness at the YWCA. In 1950 she returned to Vienna as a visitor, representing New Zealand at an international gymnastics festival.

== Personal life ==
Gisela Frankl was married to Adolph Leo Taglicht from 1921 to 1923. She returned permanently to Austria in 1964, and died in Salzburg in 1981.
