= Desmond Fitzmaurice =

Australian cricketer

Personal information
- Born: 16 October 1917; Melbourne, Australia
- Died: 19 January 1981 (aged 63); Melbourne, Australia

Domestic team information
- Years: Team
- 1947-1950: Victoria
- Source: Cricinfo, 29 November 2015

Desmond Michael John Fitzmaurice (16 October 1917 – 19 January 1981) was an Australian cricketer. He played 17 first-class cricket matches for Victoria between 1947 and 1950. In 1949-50 Fitzmaurice toured India with the Commonwealth cricket team, playing as the opening bowler in two tests. Fitzmaurice also played in England in the Central Lancashire league and coached in South Africa.

== See also ==
- List of Victoria first-class cricketers
