= Fritz Walter (politician) =

German politician

Fritz Walter (German pronunciation: [fʁɪt͡s ˈvaltɐ], audio; August 30, 1896 in Ohrdruf – April 1, 1977) was a German politician of FDP.
