= Elizabeth Frances Corbett =

American writer of fiction, poems, and plays (1887–1981)

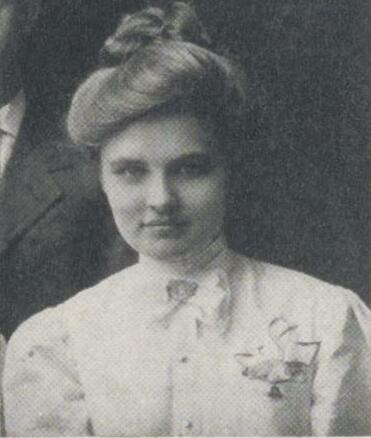
- Born: September 30, 1887; Aurora
- Died: January 24, 1981
- Occupation: Writer

Elizabeth Frances Corbett (September 30, 1887 – January 24, 1981) was an American writer of fiction, poems, and plays.

Corbett was known for her contemporary and historical fiction novels. Her books were published from the 1910s throughout the 1970s. Her New York Times obituary noted "[f]or more than 50 years Miss Corbett wrote a succession of historical or period novels that were consistently popular, particularly among women. Reviewers often termed her nostalgic works ''entertaining'' and ''friendly'' without being ''significant'".

== Biography ==
=== Early life ===
Elizabeth Frances Corbett was born in Aurora, Illinois, on September 30, 1887.

She attended the Model Department of the Milwaukee State Normal School and later West Division High School. She earned a Bachelor of Arts from the University of Wisconsin–Madison in 1910. She was a member of Phi Beta Kappa.

Corbett lived in Milwaukee for much of her young adult life.

=== Career ===
Corbett completed her first book shortly after graduation, but it was not published.

She was well known for her Mrs. Meigs series and the Graper Girls series. Some of her Mrs. Meigs stories first appeared in The Century Magazine. The Young Mrs. Meigs (1931) was met with critical acclaim. Kirkus Reviews wrote of the second book in the series, A Nice Long Evening (1933), "Not as sparkingly original as its predecessor, but an entertaining story". Kirkus reviewed the third entry in The Graper Girls series, Growing up with the Grapers (1934), as seeming to have "a distinct drop in quality".

Her novels Mr. Underhill's Progress (1934) and The Constant Sex (1935) received starred reviews from Kirkus Reviews. About Mr. Underhill's Progress, Kirkus wrote: "The Young Mrs. Meigs proved that Elizabeth Corbett had an uncanny perception of the mental and emotional processes of women much older than herself. Now comes Mr. Underhill, and in him she gets under the skin of an older man, a man at that indiscriminate age between fifty and sixty, neither old nor young and beginning to doubt the possibility of changing the pattern" and wrote about The Constant Sex: "Elizabeth Corbett has not quite hit the high water mark of The Young Mrs. Meigs in her later books, but this is closer to it than the others. A good story...".

With Immortal Helen (1947) Corbett had a new publisher, Doubleday, and a new genre, historical fiction. Kirkus reviewed the sequel, Eve and Christopher (1948), noting, "[t]he decorative details here, and the clinches (on the buxom side for conservatives) gives this its romantic reader interest- for women only".

Corbett's final novel was Sunday at Six (1971).

=== Beliefs about writing ===
In a 1934 interview, Corbett offered career advice to writers, advising "anybody not to write if she can do anything else in the world" because "the writing career entails too many disappointments in its early stages. But if one really wants to write, she won't be happy doing anything else". She spoke against budding writers seeking out literary agents and instead suggested they send out their own work and face rejection slips. She thought an education was valuable to a writing career, but not necessarily writing courses. She thought the most important characteristics for a writer to have were imagination, an understanding of human nature, and a willingness to work hard. She believed character was much more important than plot; she developed her plots from characters' circumstances in strange situations.

=== Personal life and death ===
Following the death of her father in the 1920s, Corbett moved to New York City with her mother.

Corbett died in her Greenwich Village apartment in Manhattan on January 24, 1981. She is buried at Arlington Park Cemetery, Greenfield, Wisconsin.

== Works ==
- Cecily and the Wide World: a Novel of American Life Today. 1916.
- The Vanished Helga. 1918.
- Puritan and Pagan. 1920.
- The After Glow. 1925.
- Walt: The Good Gray Poet Speaks for Himself. 1928.
- If It Takes All Summer: The Life Story of Ulysses Grant. 1930.
- After Five O'clock. 1932.
- The House Across the River. 1934.
- Mr. Underhill's Progress. 1934.
- The Constant Sex. 1935.
- The Queen's Holiday. 1940.
- Faye's Folly. 1941.
- Early Summer. 1942.
- Golden Grain. 1943.
- The Red-Haired Lady. 1945. [Autobiographical novel]
- Lady with Parasol. 1946.
- Immortal Helen. 1947.
- Eve and Christopher [sequel to Immortal Helen]. 1949.
- The Duke's Daughter. 1950.
- Portrait of Isabelle. 1951.
- The Richer Harvest. 1952.
- In Mrs. Armstrong's Room. 1953.
- Family Portrait. 1955.
- The Head of Apollo. 1956.
- Professor Preston at Home. 1957.
- The President's Wife. 1958.
- Hamilton Terrace. 1960.
- Hidden Island. 1961.
- The Paige Girls. 1962.
- Distant Princess. 1963.
- The Heart of the Village. 1963.
- Lisa Kennerley's Husband. 1964.
- Anniversary: A Novel. 1964.
- The Continuing City. 1965.
- The Crossroads. 1965.
- The Old Callahan Place. 1966.
- Harry Martin's Wife. 1967.
- The Kimball Collection. 1967.
- Ladies' Day. 1968.
- The Three Lives of Sharon Spence. 1969.
- Hotel Belvedere. 1970.
- The Wainwright Inheritance. 1972.
- The Paige Girls. 1972.
- Sunday at Six. 1971.

=== Mrs. Meigs series ===
1. The Young Mrs. Meigs. 1931.
2. A Nice Long Evening. 1933.
3. Mrs. Meigs and Mr. Cunningham. 1936.
4. She Was Carrie Eaton: A Novel about the Young Mrs. Meigs. 1938.
5. Mr. & Mrs. Meigs. 1940.
6. Excuse Me, Mrs. Meigs. 1943.
  - Our Mrs. Meigs. 1954. One volume containing The Young Mrs. Meigs, A Nice Long Evening, and Mrs. Meigs and Mr. Cunningham.

=== The Graper Girls series ===
1. The Graper Girls. Illustrated by Ruth King. 1931.
2. The Graper Girls Go to College. 1932.
3. Growing up with the Grapers. 1934.
4. Beth and Ernestine Graper. 1936.

=== Mount Royal series ===
1. Mount Royal: Chronicles of an American Town. 1936.
2. The Langworthy Family. 1937.
3. Light of Other Days: A Novel of Mount Royal. 1938.
4. Charley Manning. 1939.

=== Memoir ===
- Out at the Soldiers' Home: A Memory Book. 1941.
