= Ernest Kruskopf =

New Zealand cricketer

Personal information
- Full name: Ernest Alexander Kruskopf
- Born: 3 February 1919; Lawrence, Otago, New Zealand
- Died: 20 January 1981 (aged 61); Invercargill, Southland, New Zealand

Domestic team information
- Years: Team
- 1944/45: Otago
- Source: ESPNcricinfo, 15 May 2016

Ernest Alexander Kruskopf (3 February 1919 – 20 January 1981) was a New Zealand cricketer. He played two first-class matches for Otago in the 1944–45 season.

Kruskopf was born at Lawrence in Otago in 1919. He played club cricket in Dunedin as a bowler before making his representative debut for the provincial side in December 1944, playing against Canterbury at Lancaster Park in Christchurch. He took a single wicket on debut before going wicketless in Otago's next match later in the month against Wellington at Carisbrook. He batted at the tail and scored 18 runs, with a highest score of nine not out.

Kruskopf worked as a civil servant. During World War II he served in the New Zealand Engineers. He died in 1981 at Invercargill at the age of 61.
