= Svend Evensen =

Norwegian judge

- Born: 30 December 1880; Vestby, Norway
- Died: 9 September 1948 (aged 67)
- Occupation: Judge

Svend Evensen (30 December 1880 – 9 September 1948) was a Norwegian judge.

He was born in Vestby to merchant Ole Evensen and Cathinca Soelberg. He graduated as cand.jur. in 1905, and was named as a Supreme Court Justice from 1933.
