= Per Egil Evensen =

Norwegian politician (born 1950)

Per Egil Evensen (born 28 October 1950) is a Norwegian politician for the Progress Party.

He served as a deputy representative to the Norwegian Parliament from Østfold during the term 2005–2009.

He has been a member of Halden municipal council.
