= Knut Nordholm =

Swedish fencer

Personal information
- Born: 24 August 1902 Scania, Sweden
- Died: 5 January 1981 (aged 78) Malmö, Sweden

Sport
- Sport: Fencing

Knut Nordholm (24 August 1902 – 5 January 1981) was a Swedish fencer. He competed in the team sabre event at the 1936 Summer Olympics.
