= Neil Reidman =

British film and television actor (born 1970)

Neil Reidman (born early 1970s) is a British film and television actor.

== Biography ==
Reidman was born in Birmingham, England. His parents were from Jamaica. At the age of 13 he began attending Birmingham School of Speech and Drama and soon after, he auditioned for the Central Junior Television Workshop. That audition landed him a spot at the Midlands Arts Centre. Later, he trained in method acting at the Rose Bruford College of Speech and Drama in London. His early work included roles in productions of Prince of Morocco, Merchant of Venice, and Pinocchio. He is perhaps best known for his role as Lt. Atillo in the popular BBC TV drama Doctor Who as well as Dr Michael Tendai in 'The Detectorists'.

== Television credits ==
Since graduating from Drama school Reidman made his television film debut in 2000 Tough Love, and later that year, he had a recurring role in three episodes of The Bill, where he played the part of Daryl Gilchrist.

2001 saw him in the role of Neil for a single episode of Doctors. Then, for the 2002-03 television season, he appeared in three episodes of Holby City, in the role of DC Windsor.

In 2007, Reidman achieved his most prominent role to date appearing as "Lieutenant Atillo" in Doctor Who. Other television appearances include EastEnders and roles in Body Story, Crimewatch File, Nature Boy, Come Outside (which starred Lynda Baron of Open All Hours), All About Me with Jasper Carrot, and the ITV hit Drama The Level. In 2016, Neil was cast as the guest lead in a New Year's Eve special of the long running medical Drama Casualty. The hour long episode was seen by over four million viewers.

In summer 2018 and late 2019, he appeared in episodes of Doctors as his recurring character Simon Shelby the best friend of the regular character Dr Grainger. He played "Dr. Michael Tendai" in the Bafta Award Winning series Detectorists alongside Mackenzie Crook. Neil was flown to the Dominican Republic and South Korea where he played "Officer Ruud" in the award winning Netflix Series Narco Saints

== Film credits ==
In 2007, Reidman appeared in The Birthday Treat and Fast Break. His work in the lead role of Darren in The Birthday Treat brought him the Best Male Actor award at the 9th BFM International Film Festival. The film went on to receive awards for Best Screenplay and Best Film. That same year, Reidman starred in Fast Break (Fierce Productions), which won the First Light Film Awards.

In 2008, he returned to the BFM in Win Lose or Draw with a nomination for Best Actor. Though he did not win that award the picture won Best Film.

Reidman went on to star as Ricky in Sh*t Happens, a motion picture that he wrote and directed himself for FourthWall Productions. After his role in the film 'Win Lose or Draw' (ODAC productions) he gained his first lead role in a feature 'Hard time Bus'.The film was an instant success and was nominated in festivals worldwide. It won Best film in many International film festivals including the Hollywood Black Film Festival and nominated in six categories in the renowned American Black Film Festival sponsored by (HBO). 'Hard time Bus' completed a tour in cinemas across the UK as well as being screened both in New York and LA. Neil was nominated for Best actor for his portrayal of 'Mark Bishop' at the ABFF in New York. Since then Reidman starred in 'Class 15', 'Almost saw the Sunshine' and most recently 'IF' a film based on the famous poem by Rudyard Kipling.

== Stage ==
In 1999, Reidman won the role of Mesrou in The Dispute, a play that was produced by Neil Bartlett at The Other Place in Stratford-Upon-Avon. In 2008, he appeared opposite the singer known as Yaa in the musical The Big Life (directed by Clint Dyer). Uk tour of 'One flew over the cuckoos nest' starring Shane Richie and the late great comedian Felix Dexter. Elephant 21 (Royal Court), 'All babies are the same'(Theatre 503), The Color Purple Musical (Menier chocolate factory) starring Cynthia Enrivo and went on to be transferred to Broadway winning a Tony Award for Best Musical. Neil played the lead in 'Routes' as part of Black History Month (Riverside Theatre Newport/Welsh Millennium centre) and was also screened on 'Made in Cardiff' TV as well as Ignatious Sancho in 'Phyllis in London' at the Greenwich Theatre London. Neil played the manager 'Bill Devaney' in the UK tour of 'The Bodyguard' musical alongside singer Alexandra Burke, 'Beresford' in 'Generations' Nottingham Arts Theatre. 'Daniel Tull' in 'Our little hour' a musical based on the life of Walter Tull a Uk No1 tour. Neil had written and directed a one man show 'Without' a Windrush story about him and his father for which he was nominated for Best Male lead Actor in a Play at the Black British Theatre Awards 2024.

== Radio ==
- Memory Lane (Dr Who audio release),
- Redeeming History (Radio 3)
- Fruit Salad (BBC Radio 4)
- This Bitter Sweet Earth (BBC Radio 4)
- Trauma (BBC Radio 4)
- The Big Life (BBC Radio 4)
- Shades of Black (BBC Radio 4)
- Hands (BBC Radio 4)
- Top Story (BBC Radio 4)

== Related awards ==
- First Light Film Awards 2007, Best Drama 2007, for the film Fast Break
- National Television Awards, Best Drama 2007, for the series Dr Who
- Birmingham International Film Festival, Best Drama Documentary 2007, 'Win Lose or Draw'
- 9th BFM International Film Festival, Best Screenplay, 2007, 'Birthday Treat'

Winner Best Actor 2007, 'Birthday Treat'

- 10th BFM International Film Festival, Best Film, 2008, 'Win Lose or Draw'
- 10th BFM International Film Festival, Best Actor nominee, 'Win Lose or Draw'
- 8th Annual Music Video and Screen Awards, Best Film, 2014, 'Hard Time Bus'
- 18th Annual American Black Film Festival, 2014, Best Actor nominee, 'Hard Time Bus' Winner Best Film, 2014 'Hard Time Bus'

2015 Best Actor Nominnee, 'Hard Time Bus' American Black Film Festival, New York

Best Male Lead Actor in a Play nominee, 'Without' also written and directed By Neil Reidman The Black British Theatre Awards 2024 London
