= Hella Katz =

Austrian photographer (1899–1981)

- Katz in the early 1930s, unknown photographer
- Born: Helene Katz; 20 September 1899; Lemberg, Kingdom of Galicia and Lodomeria, Austria-Hungary
- Died: 20 January 1981 (aged 81); Darlington, County Durham, England
- Other names: Helene Katz-Lowis, Helen Lowis
- Occupation: photographer
- Years active: 1920–1939

Hella Katz (20 September 1899 – 20 January 1981) was the professional name of the Jewish photographer Helene Katz. Arriving in Vienna at the beginning of World War I, Katz became an influential photographer in the city in the interwar period. She has photographs in the collections of the Vienna Museum.

== Early life ==
Helene Katz was born on 20 September 1899 in Lemberg, in the Kingdom of Galicia and Lodomeria, which at the time was administered under the terms of the Third Partition of Poland by Austria-Hungary. In 1914 during World War I, she fled from the Russian advance with her German-speaking, Jewish family from eastern Galicia, in what is now Ukraine, to Vienna. In 1915, she enrolled in the National Higher Institute of Graphic Teaching and Research, from which she graduated in 1920.

== Career ==
Katz practiced her craft of photography for two years before applying for her trade license in August 1922. Within three years, she opened her own studio at #18 Stubenring Boulevard. It was a favorable time for women to engage in business, as workers were scarce, and many businesses were understaffed. Women who wanted to enter the workforce found openings in the arts including dance, film, photography, and radio studios, as well as in the theater. Katz built her reputation as a portrait photographer, taking pictures of society figures as well as artists and performers.

Her repertoire expanded to include nude photographs and modern dance and by the 1930s, Katz was one of the most well-known photographers in Vienna. She participated in several art exhibitions and attracted students. Among those who studied with her were Elly Niebuhr, Hans Popper (later known as John H. Popper), and Anton Josef Trčka. When the Nazis came to power in early 1938, initially Katz was allowed to continue teaching. Until Kristallnacht, she continued teaching and was allowed to produce photographs for emigrating Jews. Because she had approval to engage in business, she was not placed under surveillance and was able to liquidate her business and vacate the premises under the terms of her lease by 30 April 1939.

After having given her notice, Katz terminated her registration as an Austrian Jew on 20 March 1939 and made plans with the assistance of William L. Shirer to leave the country. In April, she registered in London with the Jewish Refugee Committee. In May, she asked the committee for help in locating a shipping company to arrange the shipping of her luggage to the United States, but did not ultimately leave England, having found lodging in Oxshott, Surrey. Back in Vienna, under the Aryanization Laws, Franz Jungwirth, a Nazi bureaucrat, was assigned to liquidate Katz's business. His report, made in July 1939, indicated that the only remaining property at her studio were a few cameras and accessories, and minimal furnishings of no value. Her archive of photographs and negatives had been lost or looted.

After the war, in early 1948, Katz married Ronald Lowis, of Shildon. He was a tobacconist and very involved in the local Methodist church. She became involved in church work and only occasionally took photographs.

== Death and legacy ==
Lowis died on 20 January 1981 in Darlington, County Durham. From 22 October 2012 through 3 March 2013, the Jewish Museum Vienna hosted an exhibition, Vienna’s Shooting Girls: Jewish Women Photographers from Vienna, which featured the work of forty Jewish women photographers, including Katz. In the interwar period, two-thirds of all photography studios in Vienna, had been run by Jewish women and the collection paid homage to their impact on the city. Some of Katz's work is preserved in the Vienna Museum in a special collection dedicated to photographers who took pictures of the avant-garde dancers of the interwar era.
