= Augusta Kalloch Christie =

American educator and politician (1887–1981)

Member of the Maine Senate
- In office 1961–1964

Member of the Maine House of Representatives
- In office 1953–1961

Personal details
- Born: October 28, 1887 Ashland, Maine, U.S.
- Died: January 22, 1981 (aged 93) Presque Isle, Maine, U.S.
- Spouse: Walter R. Christie
- Education: Aroostook State Normal School
- Profession: Educator, Politician
- Known for: First woman to serve in both the Maine House & Senate; President of the Maine W.C.T.U.

Augusta Kalloch Christie (October 28, 1887 – January 22, 1981) was an American educator and politician. She was the first woman to serve in both the Maine House of Representatives and the Maine Senate, serving from 1952 to 1964. Christie also served as the President of the Maine Woman's Christian Temperance Union (W.C.T.U.). A building at Northern Maine Community College is named in her honor.

== Early life and education ==
Christie was born in Ashland, Maine, to Rufus G. Kalloch and Martha Jan (Chandler) Kalloch. She attended Presque Isle High School and Aroostook State Normal School.

== Career ==
Christie began her career teaching in rural schools around Ashland. She later transitioned to a business career, studying at Beal School of Shorthand in Bangor. After graduation, she worked for a potato dealer in Presque Isle until her marriage to Walter R. Christie. When the military base in Presque Isle closed in 1961, Christie helped put forward and pass LD 1542, which established what is now Northern Maine Community College, on part of the land of the former base.

== Political career ==
Christie was elected to the Maine House of Representatives in 1952 and served four terms. She was a member of the liquor control committee and served as its house chairman during her last term. Christie opposed liquor bills and supported legislation against liquor, gambling, and unfavorable labor laws. In 1961, she was elected to the Maine Senate, where she served two terms. During her tenure, she was a member of the committee on state government and chaired the Aroostook County delegation.

== Legacy ==
In honor of Christie's dedication to education and public service, a building at Northern Maine Community College was named after her. The A.K. Christie Building, now known as the Christie Complex, houses most of NMCC's programs.
