= Kenneth W. Wolfe =

American politician and businessman

Kenneth W. Wolfe (March 27, 1908 – January 11, 1981) was an American politician and businessman.

Wolfe was born in Minneapolis, Minnesota. He lived in St. Louis Park, Minnesota with his wife and family and was involved in the printing business. Wolfe served as Mayor of St. Louis Park and on the St. Louis Park City Council. He served in the Minnesota Senate from 1967 to 1982 and was a Republican. Wolfe died at Methodist Hospital in St. Louis Park, Minnesota.
