= Romuald Adam Cebertowicz =

Polish inventor and hydrotechnician

Romuald Adam Cebertowicz (February 7, 1897 in Głowno – January 14, 1981 in Łódź, Poland) was a Polish hydrotechnician and a member of the Polish Academy of Sciences (PAN). He created a novel method of ground solidification, electrogeosmosis, which was used to help preserve buildings in Warsaw and Venice.
