= Charles Thomas Wangensteen =

American politician (1897–1968)

Charles Thomas Wangensteen (May 8, 1897 – April 24, 1968) was an American lawyer and politician.

Wangensteen was born in Lake Park, Becker County, Minnesota. He received his bachelor's degree from the University of Minnesota and his law degree from the University of Minnesota Law School. Wangensteen was admitted to the Minnesota bar and lived in Chisholm, St. Louis County, Minnesota with his wife and family. He served in the United States Army during the Pancho Villa Expedition and World War I. Wangensteen served in the Minnesota House of Representatives from 1933 to 1936.
