= Doy Reed =

Australian rules footballer

Personal information
- Full name: Edgar Leslie Reed
- Born: 1 July 1895; Colac, Victoria
- Died: 4 January 1981 (aged 85); Barwon Heads, Victoria
- Original team: Newtown

Playing career^{1}
Years	Club	Games (Goals)
1919	Geelong	4 (7)
- ^{1} Playing statistics correct to the end of 1919.

Edgar Leslie "Doy" Reed (1 July 1895 – 4 January 1981) was an Australian rules footballer who played with Geelong in the Victorian Football League (VFL).
