= Wangensteen suction =

A Wangensteen suction apparatus is a modified siphon that maintains constant negative pressure. Used on a duodenal tube, it relieves gastric and intestinal distention caused by the retention of fluid. It was first created by Owen Harding Wangensteen (1898–1981), the Chief of Surgery at the University of Minnesota. His novel approach to the most important cause of death during gastrointestinal surgery has since been credited with saving more than one hundred thousand lives.

== In popular culture ==
The Wangensteen apparatus is featured in the first half of "Good Bye, Radar," a two-part episode from the eighth season of the television series M*A*S*H. When the camp's electric generator breaks down, the doctors assemble a device from kitchen and surgical supplies to drain fluid from a patient's abdomen.
