= Emil Flecken =

German painter

- Born: 22 January 1890; Süchteln, Germany
- Died: 31 January 1981 (aged 91); Cologne, Germany
- Occupation: Painter

Emil Flecken (22 January 1890 – 31 January 1981) was a German painter. His work was part of the painting event in the art competition at the 1936 Summer Olympics.
