= J. Wynn Fredericks =

American football player and coach (1899–1981)

Biographical details
- Born: July 18, 1899; Lock Haven, Pennsylvania, U.S.
- Died: January 28, 1981 (aged 81)

Playing career
- 1917: Yale
- 1919: Yale

Coaching career (HC unless noted)
- 1920–1922: The Hill School (PA)
- 1924: Lock Haven
- 1935–1939: Lock Haven

Administrative career (AD unless noted)
- 1923–1925: Lock Haven

Head coaching record
- Overall: 31–12–6 (college)

Accomplishments and honors

Championships
- 2 PSTC (1936–1937)

John Wynn Fredericks (July 18, 1899 – January 28, 1981) was an American college football player and coach. He served as the head football coach at State Teachers College in Lock Haven—now known as Lock Haven University of Pennsylvania—in 1924 and again from 1935 to 1939.

== Head coaching record ==
=== College ===
Year	Team	Overall	Conference	Standing	Bowl/playoffs
Lock Haven Bald Eagles (Independent) (1924)
1924	Lock Haven	5–3			
Lock Haven Bald Eagles (Pennsylvania State Teachers Conference) (1935–1939)
1935	Lock Haven	5–2–1	5–2–1	T–3rd	
1936	Lock Haven	6–0–2	6–0–2	1st	
1937	Lock Haven	6–0–2	4–0–1	1st	
1938	Lock Haven	4–3–1	3–1–1	5th	
1939	Lock Haven	5–4	5–1	4th	
Lock Haven:		31–12–6	23–4–5		
Total:		31–12–6			
National championship Conference title Conference division title or championship game berth
