= Park Hyun-sook =

South Korean politician (1896–1981)

Member of the National Assembly
- In office 1958–1960
- In office 1963–1967

Member of the Interim Legislative Assembly
- In office 1946–1948

Personal details
- Born: 17 October 1896; Seoul, Korea
- Died: 30 January 1981 (aged 84)

- Park Hyun-sook
- Hangul: 박현숙
- Hanja: 朴賢淑
- RR: Bak Hyeonsuk
- MR: Pak Hyŏnsuk

Park Hyun-sook (Korean: 박현숙, 17 October 1896 – 30 January 1981) was a South Korean independence activist and politician. In 1946 she was one of the four women who were appointed to the Interim Legislative Assembly, becoming South Korea's first female legislators. She later served in the National Assembly.

== Biography ==
Born in Seoul in 1896, Park was educated at Soongeui Girl's High School in Pyongyang.

Following the end of World War II, the United States Army Military Government established an Interim Legislative Assembly with 90 members; 45 elected and 45 appointed by Military Governor John R. Hodge. Although women were unable to vote in the election, Hodge appointed four women, including Park, who was a member of the Korea Women's National Party. She was later elected to the National Assembly as a representative of the Liberal Party in 1958. She lost her seat in the 1960 elections, but in the 1963 elections she was elected as a representative of the Democratic Republican Party.

She died in January 1981.
