= William Feather =

American publisher and author (1889–1981)

- Born: August 25, 1889; Jamestown, New York, U.S.
- Died: January 7, 1981 (aged 91)
- Education: Case Western Reserve University

William A. Feather (August 25, 1889 – January 7, 1981) was an American publisher and writer, based in Cleveland, Ohio.

Born in Jamestown, New York, Feather relocated with his family to Cleveland in 1903. After earning a degree from Western Reserve University in 1910, he began working as a reporter for the Cleveland Press. In 1916, he established the William Feather Magazine. In addition to writing for and publishing that magazine, and writing for other magazines as H. L. Mencken's The American Mercury, he ran a successful printing business, and wrote several books.

His large printing business, William Feather Printers produced catalogues, magazines, booklets, brochures and corporate annual reports. It moved from Cleveland to Oberlin, Ohio in 1982 after a labor dispute.

== Books ==
- As We Were Saying (1921)
- Haystacks and Smokestacks (1923)
- The ideals and follies of business (1927)
- The New Buying Era (1933)
- Let's Use the Grand Jury (1934)
- The Business of Life (1949) Simon & Schuster

== Related sites ==
- William Feather quotations
- Short biography on Case Western University's "Encyclopedia of Cleveland History" website
- "Featherisms" by Ted Landphair at VOA News (6 October 2008)
