= Lucinda Sewer Millin =

United States Virgin Islands educator and legislator

Lucinda Sewer Millin (August 26, 1892 – January 26, 1981) was an educator and legislator of the United States Virgin Islands. In 1954, she was the first woman to be elected to the Legislature of the Virgin Islands.

== Early life and education ==
Millin was born in St. John on August 26, 1892 to Philip and Alberta Knevel Sewer. She studied in Antigua and received her teacher training at the Morovian Teachers Training College.

== Career ==
Millin began her teaching career at the Moravian school in 1910. Shortly after she taught with the Naval Academy and the Virgin Islands government. In 1923, she founded her own private school, the Lucinda Millin School, which she ran for 35 years.

In 1954 she became the first woman elected to the Legislature of the Virgin Islands and she would serve five consecutive terms over ten years. Millin represented the St. Thomas-St. John District and served on the Health and Welfare Committee. In addition to her passion for education, she had a strong interest in care for the elderly and fought for improved living conditions. Shortly after her retirement from the legislature, the Lucinda Millin Home for the Aged was named for her.

Millin was a founding member of the Women's League of the Virgin Islands. In addition, she served as Democratic National Committeewoman while she was in the legislature, from 1958 to 1964.

== Personal life ==
In 1922, Millin married Allan Alexander Millin. The couple had three children: Henry, who became the Lieutenant Governor of the Virgin Islands; Dorothy, who became Deputy Commissioner for Health for Management; and Agnes, who became a teacher in the Virgin Islands school system. She died at the age of 89 on January 26, 1981. Her funeral was held at Nisky Moravian Church in St Thomas, U.S. Virgin Islands.
