= Jean Hamilton Hubener =

Australian academic (1904-1981)

- Born: Jean Isabel Hamilton; 15 August 1904; Jarrahdale, Western Australia, Australia
- Died: 15 January 1981 (aged 76); New Brunswick, Canada
- Spouse: Gustav Hübener (m. 1938; died 1950)
- Relatives: Len Hamilton (brother)
- Awards: Guggenheim Fellow (1950)

Academic background
- Education: University of Western Australia; University of Bonn; Leipzig University
- Thesis: Landschaftsverwertung im Bau höfischer Epen

Academic work
- Discipline: German studies
- Institutions: Mount Allison University; University of New Brunswick

Jean Isabel Hamilton Hübener (15 August 1904 – 15 January 1981) was an Australian academic of German studies. Originally based in Germany, she and her husband fled to Canada due to the Nazi regime. She succeeded her husband as head of the Mount Allison University Department of German after his death, and she later became head of the University of New Brunswick Department of German, the creation in which she was instrumental.

== Biography ==
Jean Isabel Hamilton, one of six siblings, was born on 15 August 1904 in Jarrahdale, Western Australia. After obtaining her BA in Languages in 1927 from the University of Western Australia, she obtained her PhD in 1931 from the University of Bonn on an Alexander von Humboldt Foundation scholarship, the first Australian women to get the latter. Her dissertation Landschaftsverwertung im Bau höfischer Epen was later published as a book the Telegraph-Journal called "a standard work in [its] field". She also studied at Leipzig University.

Following Adolf Hitler's rise to power, she and her research collaborator Gustav Hübener left for Canada after the Nazi regime refused to allow him to appear at Harvard University as a guest lecturer. The two married in Toronto on 22 September 1938. Originally a guest lecturer at the Mount Allison University Department of German, she succeeded her husband as department head after he died in 1940. She was a special lecturer in Victoria University, Toronto from 1946 to 1949.

In 1950, she was awarded a Guggenheim Fellowship to travel to Harvard University and Germany (freed from Nazi rule by then) to research "the intellectual resistance to Nazism and communism". The same year, University of New Brunswick president Albert Trueman offered his friend Hubener a position of professor of German, which she accepted after returning from her research trip. Michiel Horn said that this "illustrates once again the key role played by presidents in appointments, promotions, and dismissals".

Although Hubener wanted UNB to have a separate department for German studies, Trueman considered it impractical at the time because the Department of Modern Languages was only recently created. However, he then reconsidered this position, and the Department of German was created in 1952; she served as its first head. In 1975, she became professor emeritus at UNB.

She died on 15 January 1981 at the Bethel Nursing Home in New Brunswick.

Her brother Len Hamilton was MP for Swan (1946–1949) and Canning (1949–1961).
