= Brian Geary (footballer) =

Australian rules footballer, born 1912

Personal information
- Full name: Brian Geary
- Born: 14 December 1912
- Died: 29 January 1981 (aged 68)
- Original team: Shepparton
- Height: 180 cm (5 ft 11 in)
- Weight: 73 kg (161 lb)

Playing career^{1}
Years	Club	Games (Goals)
1934	Hawthorn	3 (1)
1941	North Melbourne	11 (1)
Total		14 (2)
- ^{1} Playing statistics correct to the end of 1941.

Brian Geary (14 December 1912 – 29 January 1981) was an Australian rules footballer who played with Hawthorn and North Melbourne in the Victorian Football League (VFL).
