= H. H. Pearson =

- Born: 5 May 1913; Mosman, New South Wales, Australia
- Died: 20 January 1981 (aged 67); Canberra, Australia
- Education: Newington College; University of Sydney
- Occupations: Surgeon; Urologist
- Spouse: Dawn
- Children: 3 sons and 3 daughters

Herbert Hilary Ingram "Hugh" Pearson MBE (5 March 1913 – 20 January 1981) was an Australian surgeon and urologist. He was instrumental in the foundation of the Australian Kidney Foundation (now Kidney Health Australia) and was an early proponent of kidney transplants in Sydney. He was a Fellow of the Royal College of Surgeons, Edinburgh, and of the Royal Australasian College of Surgeons. Pearson served as President of the Urological Society of Australasia 1962–63.

== Early life ==
Hugh Pearson was born at Mosman, New South Wales, the son of Margaret and the Rev. George Ingram Pearson a Methodist minister. He was the younger brother of the Australian Army officer Major General Sandy Pearson AO, DSO, OBE, MC (1918–2021). Pearson attended Newington College (1926–1931) and went up to the University of Sydney in 1932, graduating as a Bachelor of Medicine and Surgery with first-class honours in 1938.

== War service ==
During World War II, Pearson attained the rank of major in the Royal Army Medical Corps, a specialist unit within the British Army. He was made a Member of the Order of the British Empire in the Military Division for front line duty in North West Europe (1944–45). The award was announced in The London Gazette on 24 January 1946.

== Medical career ==
In 1949 Pearson joined the Urology Department at Sydney Hospital, and took consulting rooms at 135 Macquarie Street, Sydney, in BMA House. Sydney Hospital was involved in early kidney dialysis and with artificial kidneys from 1959. A kidney unit was formed in 1962 and the Sydney Institute of Urology, which became the Australian Kidney Foundation (AKF), was formed in 1964. Having become head of the Urology Department at Sydney, Pearson moved to Canberra in 1966 to run the AKF. In 1971 he retired from the Foundation and returned to private practice. Pearson died in the Australian Capital Territory, survived by his third wife, Dawn.
