= Jim Calvert =

Australian rules footballer, born 1917

Personal information
- Full name: Thomas James Calvert
- Born: 6 September 1917; Footscray, Victoria
- Died: 22 January 1981 (aged 63); Frankston, Victoria
- Original team: Preston

Playing career^{1}
Years	Club	Games (Goals)
1943	St Kilda	3 (0)
- ^{1} Playing statistics correct to the end of 1943.

Thomas James Calvert (6 September 1917 – 22 January 1981) was an Australian rules footballer who played with St Kilda in the Victorian Football League (VFL).
