= Bert Avery (Australian footballer) =

Australian rules footballer, born 1907

Personal information
- Full name: Bert Avery
- Born: 5 October 1907
- Died: 6 January 1981 (aged 73)
- Original team: Leopold
- Position: Follower / defender

Playing career^{1}
Years	Club	Games (Goals)
1927–1930	South Melbourne	25 (5)
1931–1933	Melbourne	39 (2)
Total		64 (7)
- ^{1} Playing statistics correct to the end of 1933.

Bert Avery (5 October 1907 – 6 January 1981) was an Australian rules footballer who played for the South Melbourne Football Club and Melbourne Football Club in the Victorian Football League (VFL).
