= William Barber (Warwickshire cricketer) =

English cricketer

- Born: William Henry Barber; 23 July 1906; Nuneaton, Warwickshire, England
- Died: 14 January 1981 (aged 74); Coventry, West Midlands, England
- Occupation: Cricketer
- Years active: 1927-1933

William Henry Barber (23 July 1906 – 14 January 1981) was an English cricketer active from 1927 to 1933 who played for Warwickshire. He was born in Nuneaton and died in Coventry. He appeared in five first-class matches as a righthanded batsman who bowled right arm fast-medium pace. He scored 71 runs with a highest score of 23. He took seven wickets with a best analysis of three for 81.
