= Vera Maslovskaya =

Belarusian poet and feminist

- Вера Маслоўская
- image taken during processing for her hearing on 14 May 1923
- Born: Vera Ignatyevna Mateychuk; 24 March 1896; Supraśl, Russian Empire (now Poland)
- Died: 23 January 1981 (aged 84); Supraśl, Polish People's Republic (now Poland)
- Other names: Vera Ignatyevna Maslovskaya-Mateychuk, Vera Matejczuk, Vera Matejchuk, Vera Ignatyevna Maslovskaya, Vera Karchevskaya-Maslovskaya, Vera Korchevskaya
- Occupations: teacher, poet, Belarusian nationalist
- Years active: 1914-1958
- Known for: organizing the Belarusian underground nationalist movement

Vera Ignatyevna Maslovskaya (Belarusian: Вера Ігнатаўна Маслоўская, romanized: Viera Ihnataǔna Masloǔskaya, 24 March [O.S. 11 March] 1896 – 23 January 1981) was a Belarusian teacher, poet and nationalist, who worked for an independent Belarus in the interwar period. Founding some of the first schools that taught in the Belarusian language, her teaching career was interrupted with her arrest for her underground activities against the Polish government. When the Soviet Union took control of the area, during World War II, she returned to teaching, establishing schools which taught a Belarusian curriculum in several cities. At the end of the war, she fled to Poland to escape a resurgence in threats against former nationalist activists. She worked in a kindergarten for five years in Silesia and then returned to Supraśl, where she served as the head of the city library and later on the Białystok District Council. She was a socialist and is considered to be one of the founders of the Belarusian women's movement.

== Early life ==
Vera Ignatyevna Mateychuk (Belarusian: Вера Ігнатаўна Матэйчук) was born on 24 March 1896 in Supraśl, which at the time was located in the Russian Empire, to Anna (née Vishnevskaya) and Ignatius Mateychuk. Mateychuk's maternal grandfather had been a runaway serf who adopted the name of Nikolai Vishnevsky, when he arrived in Supraśl; his original name was Mikhail Domanovsky. Having a large family of ten children and a small plot of land, Ignatius often had to seek employment at some distance from home. By the time Mateychuk was two or three, the family relocated to Ogrodniczki, a village eight kilometers from Białystok. She received her primary education in Ogrodniczki and attended a secondary girls' school in Supraśl.

== Career ==
=== Teaching ===
Without adequate funds to pursue further education, Mateychuk went to work in a textile factory. Conditions were poor and she organized a labor strike, but the factory hired strikebreakers and fired those who had participated. Mateychuk found a position as a domestic worker for the family of Johann Maruszewski, a German manufacturer's supervisor. Though not paid well, she earned enough money to enroll in correspondence courses from the Normal School at Svislach. By working in the day and studying evenings, Mateychuk was able to prepare for the exams just before World War I broke out. Her father took her on the two-day journey east to Svislach. She passed the examinations receiving her diploma in 1914, though she was unable to find work due to the war. When the Russians withdrew in 1915, the Germans passed a law that education could commence in the language of the native population. Mateychuk returned to Svislach to take pedagogy training at the newly established Belarusian teacher's seminary (be). As there were sufficient teachers in Białystok, in 1917, she was sent to teach in the Grodno Region in the village of Grabowiec (now Hajnowka district in Poland). She spent two years in that community, establishing one of the first schools to teach in the Belarusian language.

As World War I ended, the Russian Empire collapsed leading to the Russian Revolution. States which had previously been part of the Russian Empire asserted their autonomy. The Belarusian Soviet Socialist Republic (BSSR) was declared on 1 January 1919. The following month, it was merged with Lithuania into Litbel, officially the Lithuanian-Belarusian Soviet Socialist Republic. Litbel was dissolved in April after the Polish Army took over all the lands of Litbel during the Polish–Soviet War, declaring its territory to be part of Poland. Within this backdrop, Mateychuk moved to Vilnius in 1919 to enroll in courses offered by the Belarusian Scientific Society, which offered the first Belarusian teacher-training classes on Belarusian linguistics, literature, history. She became politically active, joining the Belarusian Socialist Revolutionary Party (be), which favored Belarusian nationalism and opposed the Polish regime.

=== Political agitation and nationalism ===
After graduating from the Vilnius course, she taught in the Barisav and Disna Districts of Minsk province between 1919 and 1920. On 12 February 1920, she married a Belarusian soldier, Vladislav Maslovsky, who was a captain in the Polish Army. Within a few months, her husband died at the front and in June of the same year, she published her first poem Idzy! in the newspaper Belarus. Around the same time, she founded the Central Union of Belarusian Women, though the organization didn't last long as it was closed by the Bolshevik forces when they entered Minsk over the summer. With Soviet control of the area established, on 1 August 1920, the BSSR was re-established in Minsk and Maslovskaya began working as an inspector for the Komissariat of Education. This position was brief, as by the end of the year, she had returned to Ogrodniczki and was working with the Belarusian People's Republic. Her instructions were to develop an underground organization with the goal of uniting all of the lands where Belarusians lived into an independent state. Maslovskaya was responsible for organizing forces opposed to both Russian and Polish rule in the areas of Bielsk Podlaski, Białystok, and Sokółka County. She quickly established a network of followers, which was joined by a partisan detachment led by Herman Szymaniuk, and began to hold meetings with Vaclau Lastouski in the Lithuanian border town of Merkinė.

In March 1921, at the end of the Polish–Soviet War, negotiators signed the Treaty of Riga, which partitioned Belarusian territories between Poland and the USSR. Though the BSSR was not dissolved, its foreign policy was determined by Moscow. In response, the All-Belarusian National-Political Convention, was held in Prague in September to discuss the terms of the treaty. Maslovskaya was sent as the delegate of the Białystok area and proposed a resolution to fight for the unification and independence of all Belarusian lands and denounce the partition. Though the convention did not adopt instituting armed conflict, they did pass Maslovskaya's proposal. Reaction from the Polish authorities was swift, and they began to infiltrate the underground network and arrest participants. Maslovskaya was arrested in 1922 and her trial began in May 1923. Along with the others arrested, the Process of the 45 took place in Białystok District Court, with Maslovskaya taking full responsibility, stating that she was the sole organizer of the group. She did not admit guilt, stated that their intent was not to foment armed insurrection, but to fight for Belarusians to have their own nation. She was sentenced to six years in prison, to be served in Białystok and Warsaw.

=== Later career ===
While in prison, Maslovskaya wrote poetry, contributing to such Belarusian newspapers as The Free Banner of Vilnius, Rassvet a Russian paper, and Breaking Dawn in the United States. With the help of intermediaries, she met with Vladimir Korchevsky, who was also a teacher and a political prisoner. When they were released in June 1927, the couple made plans to marry on 21 November that same year. Unable to teach because they had been political prisoners, the couple moved to Hajnówka, where Vladimir worked in a turpentine factory. Then they moved to the village of Olpen (Olpin) in the Brest Region of Polesia, where Vladimir served as a church psalmist and Korchevskaya organized amateur theatrical productions. Her poetry turned from revolution to works extolling the beauty of nature during this time and the couple moved again to Kodeń on the Bug River.

At the beginning of World War II, Poland was invaded in 1939 by a joint action by Nazi Germany and the Soviet forces. The BSSR regained lands previously lost to Poland by the Treaty of Riga and Soviet control was reasserted. For the Korchevskys, this meant that they could return to teaching and they took up a post in Kalanaja (be)(Belarusian: Вёска Каланая) in the Vawkavysk District. By the summer of 1940, the couple had returned to Ogrodniczki, where they founded a Belarusian junior high school. In 1941 the Nazis invaded and occupied Belarus and in December forced the Korchevskys to close the school. Secretly, they continued to teach throughout the war and afterward, until June 1946. At that time, Korchevskaya was forced to flee Białystok by way of Żagań to Silesia to escape persecutions aimed at former Belarusian activists. She organized a kindergarten in Silesia and operated it for five years, before she returned to Supraśl and began working as the head of the city library.

Korchevskaya continued publishing poems in Belarusian newspapers in Poland and participated in the Women's League. She was also elected to the Białystok District Council and was involved with the Belarusian Cultural Association of Poland until her retirement in 1958.

== Death and legacy ==
Korchevskaya died on 23 January 1981 Supraśl and was buried in the local cemetery. Several of her poetic works were published in the Białystok newspaper, Niva, the Minsk newspaper Belarus and the Vilnius newspaper Belarusian Calendar.
