= Adolph E. Waller =

Professor of botany and genetics

- Born: Adolph E. Waller; August 24, 1892; Louisville, Kentucky
- Died: January 28, 1975 (aged 82); Columbus, Ohio
- Education: University of Kentucky; University of Michigan; Ohio State University
- Scientific career
- Fields: Botany, Agroecology, Genetics, History of Science
- Workplaces: Royal Botanical Gardens, Kew; Ohio State University

Adolph E. Waller (August 24, 1892 – January 28 1975) was a professor of botany and genetics. Waller was a member of the faculty of The Ohio State University for 45 years, where he was an authority on iris breeding and horticulture, plant ecology and genetics.
