= Wang Shanyuan =

Chinese microbiologist

- 王善源
- Born: 11 November 1907; Dutch East Indies
- Died: 1 January 1981 (aged 73); Beijing, China
- Education: Leiden University; University of Paris; EMI College London
- Scientific career
- Fields: Microbiology
- Workplaces: Peking Union Medical College

Wang Shanyuan (Chinese: 王善源; pinyin: Wáng Shànyuán; 11 November 1907 – 1 January 1981) was a Chinese microbiologist and an academician of the Chinese Academy of Sciences.

== Biography ==
Wang was born in Dutch East Indies, on 11 November 1907. He graduated from the Medical department of Leiden University in 1929 and later the Physics and Mathematics Department, University of Paris in 1938. He earned a Doctor of Medicine, a PhD in physics, and a Bachelor of Electrical Engineering, all from the EMI College London.

He came to China in November 1956 and that same year became a researcher at the Institute of Epidemiology and Microbiology, Chinese Academy of Medical Sciences (now Peking Union Medical College).

On 1 January 1981, he died in Beijing, aged 73.

== Honours and awards ==
- 1957 Member of the Chinese Academy of Sciences (CAS)
