= Leslie Ward (cricketer) =

English cricketer (1908–1981)

Personal information
- Full name: Leslie Maynard Ward
- Born: 2 May 1908; Coventry, Warwickshire, England
- Died: 13 January 1981 (aged 72); Bideford, Devon, England
- Batting: Right-handed
- Bowling: Right-arm medium Right-arm off break

Domestic team information
- Years: Team
- 1930: Warwickshire

Career statistics
Competition	First-class
Matches	1
Runs scored	5
Batting average	5.00
100s/50s	–/–
Top score	5
Balls bowled	48
Wickets	1
Bowling average	29.00
5 wickets in innings	–
10 wickets in match	–
Best bowling	1/29
Catches/stumpings	1/–
- Source: Cricinfo, 4 October 2015

Leslie Maynard Ward (2 May 1908 – 13 January 1981) was an English cricketer who made one appearance in first-class cricket in 1930. He was a right-handed batsman, who bowled both right-arm medium and right-arm off break.

Ward made his only appearance in first-class cricket when he was selected to play for Warwickshire against Leicestershire at Hinckley. In a drawn match, Ward batted once, scoring 5 runs in Warwickshire's only innings, but was dismissed bowled by Norman Armstrong. He wasn't required to bowl in Leicestershire's first-innings, during which Joseph Mayer and Derek Foster shared nine of the ten wickets to fall as Leicestershire were bowled out for 53 in 23.2 overs. Made to follow-on in their second-innings, Leicestershire reached 294/8 at the close of the match, with Ward taking his only first-class wicket when he dismissed Ewart Astill, finishing with figures of 1/29 from 8 overs.

He died at Bideford, Devon on 13 January 1981.
