= Harold Black (civil servant) =

Sir Harold Black (9 April 1914 – 19 January 1981) was a British civil servant in Northern Ireland. He was Secretary to the Cabinet and Clerk of the Privy Council from 1965 to 1972, and Deputy Secretary, Northern Ireland Office from 1972 to 1974, following the introduction of direct rule.
