= D. Neil Reid =

American politician

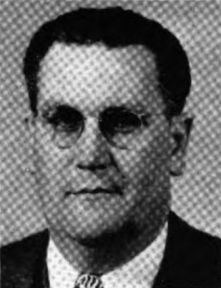

Member of the Michigan House of Representatives from the Wayne County 1st district
- In office January 1, 1947 – January 1, 1949

Personal details
- Born: March 30, 1900 Redford Township, Michigan
- Died: January 22, 1981 (aged 80) Detroit, Michigan
- Party: Republican
- Spouse: Laura
- Children: 3
- Education: Northwestern High School; University of Michigan

D. Neil Reid (March 30, 1900 – January 22, 1981) was a Michigan politician.

== Early life ==
Reid was born on March 30, 1900, in a part of Redford Township, Michigan, which is now Detroit. Reid attended Northwestern High School. Reid worked for Redford State Savings Bank until 1921, when he started attending the University of Michigan where he would earn a bachelor's degree in 1924 and then a Bachelor of Laws in 1926. In 1927, Reid would start practicing law. In 1933, he started a law firm by the name of Reid & Young with Leslie P. Young.

== Political career ==
In 1936, Reid was a delegate to the Republican National Convention from Michigan. In 1944, Reid would run to for a Michigan House of Representatives seat representing the Wayne County 1st district unsuccessfully. On November 5, 1946, Reid would successfully run for this position, and serve in this position from January 1, 1947, to January 1, 1949. He failed to gain re-election in 1948, and again ran unsuccessfully for this seat in 1950.

== Personal life ==
Reid married Laura Elizabeth Craft in 1928. Together they had three children. Reid was a Freemason, a member of the Knights Templar, and a member of the Kiwanis.

== Death ==
Reid died on January 22, 1981, in Detroit, Michigan. He is interred at Grand Lawn Cemetery in Detroit.
