= Reg Evenden =

Australian rules footballer, born 1919

Personal information
- Full name: Reg Evenden
- Born: 25 January 1919
- Died: 8 January 1981 (aged 61)
- Height: 183 cm (6 ft 0 in)
- Weight: 82.5 kg (182 lb)
- Position: Fullback

Playing career^{1}
Years	Club	Games (Goals)
1938–48	Footscray	109 (13)
- ^{1} Playing statistics correct to the end of 1948.

Reg Evenden (25 January 1919 – 8 January 1981) was an Australian rules footballer who played with Footscray in the Victorian Football League (VFL).
