= Bagio Gavinelli =

Italian cyclist (1898–1981)

Personal information
- Born: 30 January 1898
- Died: 7 January 1981 (aged 82)

Cycling career
- Sport: Cycling
- Discipline: Road
- Role: Rider

Bagio Gavinelli (30 January 1898 – 7 January 1981) was an Italian racing cyclist. He rode in the 1928 Tour de France.
