= Fritz Walter (football executive) =

German football executive

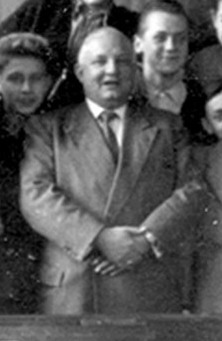
Fritz Walter in 1956.

Dr. phil. Fritz Walter (March 15, 1900 – January 5, 1981) was one of the most successful and important chairmen of the VfB Stuttgart.
