= Anton Josef Trčka =

Austrian-Czech photographer, painter and poet (1893–1940)

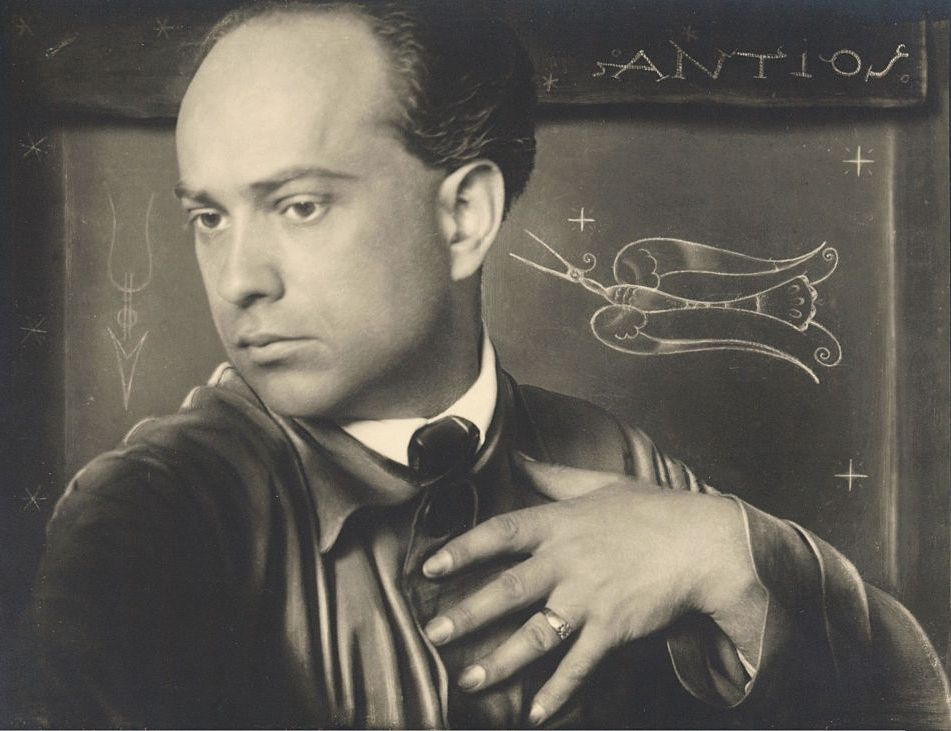
- Self-portrait, c. 1925
- Born: 7 September 1893; Vienna, Austria-Hungary
- Died: 16 March 1940 (aged 46); Vienna, Nazi Germany
- Education: Academy of Fine Arts Vienna
- Known for: Photography, poetry
- Movement: Symbolism, Expressionism

Anton Josef Trčka (7 September 1893 – 16 March 1940) was an Austrian-Czech photographer, painter and poet. He was mostly known for his portraits, which he signed with the name "Antios," a combination of his first and middle names. His studio was destroyed by a bomb in 1944, and photographs of artists Gustav Klimt and Egon Schiele are some of the few surviving examples of his work.

== Biography ==
Trčka was born on 7 September 1893 in Vienna to Czech parents who came from Moravia hence throughout his life he was connected with both Germanic and Czech cultures. He lived and worked in Prague and Vienna. In 1911 he entered the Academy of Fine Arts Vienna. During that time he experimented with new photographic techniques, and some of his pictures were produced both in silver bromide and bromoil prints, as mirror images. He also often modified the background of a negative with a brush to create a more artistic expression.

In the early 1910s Trčka reproduced some paintings of Egon Schiele. Trčka photographed Schiele in early 1914. Between 1916 and 1918, he served with the Austrian Army, and then worked as a military photographer. He resumed his studio work in 1924. Continuing to study his craft, Trčka was one of the students of Hella Katz.

Trčka was married to Clara Schlesinger. He died in Vienna on 16 III 1940 aged 46, from carbon monoxide poisoning.
