= Richard Juckes =

English cricketer

Personal information
- Full name: Richard Humphrey Juckes
- Born: 21 January 1902; Horsham, Sussex, England
- Died: 21 January 1981 (aged 79); Tredington, Gloucestershire, England
- Batting: Right-handed
- Relatives: James Douglas (brother-in-law)

Domestic team information
- Years: Team
- 1924: Sussex

Career statistics
| Competition | First-class |
|---|---|
| Matches | 1 |
| Runs scored | 1 |
| Batting average | 1.00 |
| 100s/50s | –/– |
| Top score | 1 |
| Balls bowled | – |
| Wickets | – |
| Bowling average | – |
| 5 wickets in innings | – |
| 10 wickets in match | – |
| Best bowling | – |
| Catches/stumpings | –/– |
- Source: Cricinfo, 28 November 2011

Richard Humphrey Juckes (21 January 1902 – 21 January 1981) was an English cricketer. Juckes was a right-handed batsman. He was born in Horsham, Sussex, and educated at The King's School, Canterbury.

Juckes made a single first-class appearance for Sussex against Cambridge University at the Fenner's, Cambridge in 1924. In Sussex's first-innings, he was dismissed for a single run by Philip Wright, while in their second-innings he was not required to bat. Sussex won the match by 7 wickets. This was his only major appearance for Sussex.

He died in Tredington, Gloucestershire, on 21 January 1981, his 79th birthday. His brother-in-law, James Douglas, also played first-class cricket.
