= 1981 in British music =

This is a summary of 1981 in music in the United Kingdom, including the official charts from that year.

== Events ==
- 9 February – Phil Collins releases his first solo album, although he would not leave the band Genesis until 1995.
- 14 February – Billy Idol leaves Generation X to begin a solo career.
- 26 February – The Symphony No. 2 by Peter Maxwell Davies commissioned by the Boston Symphony Orchestra in celebration of its centenary, receives its world premiere at Symphony Hall, Boston, with Seiji Ozawa conducting.
- 4 April – Bucks Fizz win the Eurovision Song Contest with "Making Your Mind Up".
- 7 April – Former Who manager Kit Lambert dies after falling down a flight of stairs in his mother's home in London.
- 17 April – Eric Clapton is released from St. Paul's Hospital in Minnesota following a month-long treatment for bleeding ulcers.
- 18 April – Yes announce that they are breaking up. They would, however, reunite frequently in the future.
- 25 April – Paul McCartney's band, Wings, officially breaks up.
- 2 May – Working as a local wedding singer 12 months previously, Scottish vocalist Sheena Easton hits number one in the US with "Morning Train (9 to 5)"
- 11 May – The musical Cats begins its 8,949-performance run on London's West End.
- August – The success of Stars on 45 leads to a short-lived medley craze. The most successful imitator of the Stars on 45 format is, rather unexpectedly, the Royal Philharmonic Orchestra, whose "Hooked on Classics (Parts 1 & 2)" reaches number two in the charts.
- 17 June – Pink Floyd perform their last full concert with Roger Waters, as part of The Wall Tour, at Earls Court in London. Waters would not perform with the band again until a one-off performance for Live 8 in 2005.
- 13 July – The first performance of George Lloyd‘s Symphony No 4, written in 1945-6 after the composer’s harrowing wartime experiences in the Arctic convoys, at the Cheltenham Festival.
- 14 September – Emma Kirkby and Gothic Voices record the album A Feather on the Breath of God in St Jude-on-the-Hill, Hampstead Garden Suburb, London.
- 23 September – The first performance of Christian Darnton‘s Twenty Minute Symphony (his fourth), composed in 1978 with the subtitle Diabolus in musica (it is based on the tritone), performed by the BBC Northern Symphony Orchestra under Edward Downes.

== Charts ==
=== Number-one singles ===
| Issue Date | Song | Artist(s) | Sales |
|---|---|---|---|
| 3 January | "There's No One Quite Like Grandma" | St Winifred's School Choir | 103,000 |
| 10 January | "Imagine" | John Lennon | 107,900 |
| 17 January | "Imagine" | John Lennon | 142,000 |
| 24 January | "Imagine" | John Lennon | 108,000 |
| 31 January | "Imagine" | John Lennon | 82,000 |
| 7 February | "Woman" | John Lennon | 113,000 |
| 14 February | "Woman" | John Lennon | 106,000 |
| 21 February | "Shaddap You Face" | Joe Dolce Music Theatre | 126,000 |
| 28 February | "Shaddap You Face" | Joe Dolce Music Theatre | 174,000 |
| 7 March | "Shaddap You Face" | Joe Dolce Music Theatre | 118,000 |
| 14 March | "Jealous Guy" | Roxy Music | 112,000 |
| 21 March | "Jealous Guy" | Roxy Music | 97,000 |
| 28 March | "This Ole House" | Shakin' Stevens | 101,000 |
| 4 April | "This Ole House" | Shakin' Stevens | 117,000 |
| 11 April | "This Ole House" | Shakin' Stevens | 101,000 |
| 18 April | "Making Your Mind Up" | Bucks Fizz | 134,000 |
| 25 April | "Making Your Mind Up" | Bucks Fizz | 118,000 |
| 2 May | "Making Your Mind Up" | Bucks Fizz | 86,000 |
| 9 May | "Stand and Deliver" | Adam and the Ants | 102,000 |
| 16 May | "Stand and Deliver" | Adam and the Ants | 196,000 |
| 23 May | "Stand and Deliver" | Adam and the Ants | 134,000 |
| 30 May | "Stand and Deliver" | Adam and the Ants | 103,000 |
| 6 June | "Stand and Deliver" | Adam and the Ants | 82,000 |
| 13 June | "Being with You" | Smokey Robinson | 95,000 |
| 20 June | "Being with You" | Smokey Robinson | 117,000 |
| 27 June | "One Day in Your Life" | Michael Jackson | 102,000 |
| 4 July | "One Day in Your Life" | Michael Jackson | 115,000 |
| 11 July | "Ghost Town" | The Specials | 77,000 |
| 18 July | "Ghost Town" | The Specials | 100,000 |
| 25 July | "Ghost Town" | The Specials | 87,000 |
| 1 August | "Green Door" | Shakin' Stevens | 77,000 |
| 8 August | "Green Door" | Shakin' Stevens | 78,000 |
| 15 August | "Green Door" | Shakin' Stevens | 87,000 |
| 22 August | "Green Door" | Shakin' Stevens | 76,000 |
| 29 August | "Japanese Boy" | Aneka | 78,000 |
| 5 September | "Tainted Love" | Soft Cell | 135,000 |
| 12 September | "Tainted Love" | Soft Cell | 170,000 |
| 19 September | "Prince Charming" | Adam and the Ants | 146,000 |
| 26 September | "Prince Charming" | Adam and the Ants | 134,000 |
| 3 October | "Prince Charming" | Adam and the Ants | 116,000 |
| 10 October | "Prince Charming" | Adam and the Ants | 106,000 |
| 17 October | "It's My Party" | Dave Stewart and Barbara Gaskin | 84,000 |
| 24 October | "It's My Party" | Dave Stewart and Barbara Gaskin | 112,000 |
| 31 October | "It's My Party" | Dave Stewart and Barbara Gaskin | 93,000 |
| 7 November | "It's My Party" | Dave Stewart and Barbara Gaskin | 73,000 |
| 14 November | "Every Little Thing She Does Is Magic" | The Police | 76,000 |
| 21 November | "Under Pressure" | Queen and David Bowie | 85,000 |
| 28 November | "Under Pressure" | Queen and David Bowie | 102,000 |
| 5 December | "Begin the Beguine" | Julio Iglesias | 83,000 |
| 12 December | "Don't You Want Me" | The Human League | 99,000 |
| 19 December | "Don't You Want Me" | The Human League | 121,000 |
| 26 December | "Don't You Want Me" | The Human League | 142,650 |

=== Number-one albums ===
| Issue Date | Title | Artist(s) |
|---|---|---|
| 3 January | Super Trouper | ABBA |
| 10 January | Super Trouper | ABBA |
| 17 January | Super Trouper | ABBA |
| 24 January | Kings of the Wild Frontier | Adam and the Ants |
| 31 January | Kings of the Wild Frontier | Adam and the Ants |
| 7 February | Double Fantasy | John Lennon and Yoko Ono |
| 14 February | Double Fantasy | John Lennon and Yoko Ono |
| 21 February | Face Value | Phil Collins |
| 28 February | Face Value | Phil Collins |
| 7 March | Face Value | Phil Collins |
| 14 March | Kings of the Wild Frontier | Adam and the Ants |
| 21 March | Kings of the Wild Frontier | Adam and the Ants |
| 28 March | Kings of the Wild Frontier | Adam and the Ants |
| 4 April | Kings of the Wild Frontier | Adam and the Ants |
| 11 April | Kings of the Wild Frontier | Adam and the Ants |
| 18 April | Kings of the Wild Frontier | Adam and the Ants |
| 25 April | Kings of the Wild Frontier | Adam and the Ants |
| 2 May | Kings of the Wild Frontier | Adam and the Ants |
| 9 May | Kings of the Wild Frontier | Adam and the Ants |
| 16 May | Kings of the Wild Frontier | Adam and the Ants |
| 23 May | Stars on 45 | Starsound |
| 30 May | Stars on 45 | Starsound |
| 6 June | Stars on 45 | Starsound |
| 13 June | Stars on 45 | Starsound |
| 20 June | Stars on 45 | Starsound |
| 27 June | No Sleep 'til Hammersmith | Motörhead |
| 4 July | Disco Daze and Disco Nites | Various Artists |
| 11 July | Love Songs | Cliff Richard |
| 18 July | Love Songs | Cliff Richard |
| 25 July | Love Songs | Cliff Richard |
| 1 August | Love Songs | Cliff Richard |
| 8 August | Love Songs | Cliff Richard |
| 15 August | The Official BBC Album of the Royal Wedding | Various Artists |
| 22 August | The Official BBC Album of the Royal Wedding | Various Artists |
| 29 August | Time | Electric Light Orchestra |
| 5 September | Time | Electric Light Orchestra |
| 12 September | Dead Ringer | Meat Loaf |
| 19 September | Dead Ringer | Meat Loaf |
| 26 September | Abacab | Genesis |
| 3 October | Abacab | Genesis |
| 10 October | Ghost in the Machine | The Police |
| 17 October | Ghost in the Machine | The Police |
| 24 October | Ghost in the Machine | The Police |
| 31 October | Dare | The Human League |
| 7 November | Shaky | Shakin' Stevens |
| 14 November | Greatest Hits | Queen |
| 21 November | Greatest Hits | Queen |
| 28 November | Greatest Hits | Queen |
| 5 December | Greatest Hits | Queen |
| 12 December | Chart Hits '81 | Various Artists |
| 19 December | The Visitors | ABBA |
| 26 December | The Visitors | ABBA |

== Year-end charts ==
The tables below include sales between 1 January and 31 December 1981: the year-end charts reproduced in the issue of Music Week dated 26 December 1981 and played on Radio 1 on 3 January 1982 only include sales figures up until 12 December 1981.

=== Best-selling singles ===
At the end of 1981, the official year-end charts provided by the UK's chart provider, the British Market Research Bureau, stated that the best-selling single of the year was "Tainted Love" by Soft Cell. However, in March 2021, the Official Charts Company announced that new research had shown that "Don't You Want Me" by the Human League, previously thought to be the year's 21st-biggest seller, was in fact the biggest-selling single of 1981 with over one million sales, and the year-end charts were adjusted accordingly.

| No. | Title | Artist | Peak position |
|---|---|---|---|
| 1 | "Don't You Want Me" | The Human League | 1 |
| 2 | "Tainted Love" | Soft Cell | 1 |
| 3 | "Stand and Deliver" | Adam and the Ants | 1 |
| 4 | "Prince Charming" | Adam and the Ants | 1 |
| 5 | "This Ole House" | Shakin' Stevens | 1 |
| 6 | "Vienna" | Ultravox | 2 |
| 7 | "One Day in Your Life" | Michael Jackson | 1 |
| 8 | "Making Your Mind Up" | Bucks Fizz | 1 |
| 9 | "Shaddup You Face" | Joe Dolce Music Theatre | 1 |
| 10 | "The Birdie Song (Birdie Dance)" | The Tweets | 2 |
| 11 | "You Drive Me Crazy" | Shakin' Stevens | 2 |
| 12 | "Ghost Town" | The Specials | 1 |
| 13 | "It's My Party" | Dave Stewart with Barbara Gaskin | 1 |
| 14 | "Being with You" | Smokey Robinson | 1 |
| 15 | "Happy Birthday" | Altered Images | 2 |
| 16 | "Hands Up (Give Me Your Heart)" | Ottawan | 3 |
| 17 | "Woman" | John Lennon | 1 |
| 18 | "Stars on 45" | Starsound | 2 |
| 19 | "Begin the Beguine (Volver a Empezar)" | Julio Iglesias | 1 |
| 20 | "Green Door" | Shakin' Stevens | 1 |
| 21 | "Imagine" | John Lennon | 1 |
| 22 | "Jealous Guy" | Roxy Music | 1 |
| 23 | "Kids in America" | Kim Wilde | 2 |
| 24 | "Japanese Boy" | Aneka | 1 |
| 25 | "Daddy's Home" | Cliff Richard | 2 |
| 26 | "Chi Mai" | Ennio Morricone | 2 |
| 27 | "Hooked on Classics" | Royal Philharmonic Orchestra, arranged and conducted by Louis Clark | 2 |
| 28 | "Souvenir" | Orchestral Manoeuvres in the Dark | 3 |
| 29 | "Can Can" | Bad Manners | 3 |
| 30 | "Antmusic" | Adam and the Ants | 2 |
| 31 | "(Do) The Hucklebuck" | Coast to Coast | 5 |
| 32 | "Hold On Tight" | ELO | 4 |
| 33 | "More Than in Love" | Kate Robbins and Beyond | 2 |
| 34 | "Love Action (I Believe in Love)" | The Human League | 3 |
| 35 | "Body Talk" | Imagination | 4 |
| 36 | "Stars on 45 (Volume 2)" | Starsound | 2 |
| 37 | "Lately" | Stevie Wonder | 3 |
| 38 | "In the Air Tonight" | Phil Collins | 2 |
| 39 | "Under Pressure" | Queen and David Bowie | 1 |
| 40 | "Going Back to My Roots" | Odyssey | 4 |
| 41 | "Under Your Thumb" | Godley and Creme | 3 |
| 42 | "Every Little Thing She Does Is Magic" | The Police | 1 |
| 43 | "Happy Birthday" | Stevie Wonder | 2 |
| 44 | "Kings of the Wild Frontier" | Adam and the Ants | 2 |
| 45 | "I Surrender" | Rainbow | 3 |
| 46 | "Pretend" | Alvin Stardust | 4 |
| 47 | "How 'Bout Us" | Champaign | 5 |
| 48 | "Endless Love" | Diana Ross and Lionel Richie | 7 |
| 49 | Four from Toyah (EP) | Toyah | 4 |
| 50 | "Let's Groove" | Earth, Wind & Fire | 3 |

=== Best-selling albums ===
| No. | Title | Artist | Peak position |
|---|---|---|---|
| 1 | Kings of the Wild Frontier | Adam and the Ants | 1 |
| 2 | Greatest Hits | Queen | 1 |
| 3 | Dare | The Human League | 1 |
| 4 | Face Value | Phil Collins | 1 |
| 5 | Shaky | Shakin' Stevens | 1 |
| 6 | Ghost in the Machine | The Police | 1 |
| 7 | Love Songs | Cliff Richard | 1 |
| 8 | Chart Hits '81 | Various Artists | 1 |
| 9 | Prince Charming | Adam and the Ants | 2 |
| 10 | Double Fantasy | John Lennon and Yoko Ono | 1 |
| 11 | The Jazz Singer | Neil Diamond | 3 |
| 12 | Making Movies | Dire Straits | 4 |
| 13 | Stars on 45 | Starsound | 1 |
| 14 | Hotter than July | Stevie Wonder | 3 (Note: Reached number 2 in 1980) |
| 15 | Vienna | Ultravox | 3 |
| 16 | Secret Combination | Randy Crawford | 2 |
| 17 | The Visitors | ABBA | 1 |
| 18 | The Best of Blondie | Blondie | 4 |
| 19 | Bat Out of Hell | Meat Loaf | 9 |
| 20 | Manilow Magic: The Best of Barry Manilow | Barry Manilow | 4 (Note: Reached number 3 in 1980) |
| 21 | Time | Electric Light Orchestra | 1 |
| 22 | Pearls | Elkie Brooks | 5 |
| 23 | Dead Ringer | Meat Loaf | 1 |
| 24 | Anthem | Toyah | 2 |
| 25 | Hooked on Classics | Royal Philharmonic Orchestra | 4 |
| 26 | Guilty | Barbra Streisand | 3 (Note: Reached number 1 in 1980) |
| 27 | Duran Duran | Duran Duran | 3 |
| 28 | Present Arms | UB40 | 2 |
| 29 | Super Hits 1 & 2 | Various Artists | 2 |
| 30 | This Ole House | Shakin' Stevens | 2 |
| 31 | Wired for Sound | Cliff Richard | 4 |
| 32 | Abacab | Genesis | 1 |
| 33 | Disco Daze/Disco Nites | Various Artists | 1 |
| 34 | Architecture and Morality | Orchestral Manoeuvres in the Dark | 3 |
| 35 | Tattoo You | The Rolling Stones | 2 |
| 36 | The Simon and Garfunkel Collection: 17 of Their All-Time Greatest Recordings | Simon & Garfunkel | 4 |
| 37 | Hi Infidelity | REO Speedwagon | 6 |
| 38 | If I Should Love Again | Barry Manilow | 5 |
| 39 | The Best of Bowie | David Bowie | 3 |
| 40 | Super Trouper | ABBA | 1 |
| 41 | No Sleep 'til Hammersmith | Motörhead | 1 |
| 42 | The Official BBC Album of the Royal Wedding | Various Artists | 1 |
| 43 | Christopher Cross | Christopher Cross | 1 |
| 44 | 7 | Madness | 5 |
| 45 | The River | Bruce Springsteen | 2 |
| 46 | Tonight I'm Yours | Rod Stewart | 8 |
| 47 | Greatest Hits | Dr. Hook | 2 |
| 48 | Difficult to Cure | Rainbow | 3 |
| 49 | Barry | Barry Manilow | 5 |
| 50 | Signing Off | UB40 | 2 |

== Classical music: new works ==
- David Bedford
  - Elegy and Caprice for oboe and piano
  - Ocean Star, a Dreaming Song, for youth orchestra
  - Prelude for a Maritime Nation
  - Sonata for piano, in one movement
  - String Quartet
  - Symphony for 12 musicians
  - Vocoder Sextet
  - Wind Sextet
- Richard Rodney Bennett
  - Impromptu on the Name of Haydn for piano
  - Isadore, ballet
  - Music for String Quartet
  - Noctuary, ballet for piano
  - Six Tunes for the Instruction of Singing-birds, flute solo
  - Sonatina for clarinet solo
  - Vocalise, for soprano and piano
- Lennox Berkeley – Bagatelles for two pianos
- Michael Berkeley
  - Flames for orchestra
  - String Quartet No. 1
  - String Quartet No. 2
  - Wessex Graves for voice and harp
- Harrison Birtwistle – Pulse Sampler for oboe and claves
- Edward Cowie – Kelly Choruses for voices and harp
- Gordon Crosse
  - Dreascanon 1 for choir, piano and percussion
  - Elegy and Scherzo Alla Marcia for string orchestra
  - Fear No More, for oboe, oboe d'amore and cor anglais
  - Peace for Brass
  - Wildboy, ballet score
- Peter Maxwell Davies
  - The Bairnes of Brugh for chamber ensemble
  - Brass Quintet
  - Hill Runes for guitar
  - Little Quartet No. 2 for string quartet
  - Lullabye for Lucy for mixed chorus
  - The Medium, monodrama for mezzo soprano
  - Piano Sonata
  - The Rainbow, music theatre for children
  - Seven Songs Home for children's voices
- Brian Ferneyhough
  - Lemma – Icon – Epigram for piano
  - Superscripto for solo piccolo
- Michael Finnissy
  - An-dimironnai for solo cello
  - Duru-duru for soprano, flute, percussion and piano
  - Jisei for ensemble
  - Kelir for six voices
  - Keroiylu for oboe, bassoon and piano
  - Piano Concert No 7
  - Reels for piano
  - Rushes for piano
  - Stomp for accordion
  - Terekkeme for solo cembalo
  - Tree Setting for piano
  - White Rain for piano or clavichord
  - Yalli for solo cello
- Alexander Goehr
  - Behold the Sun for soprano, vibraphone and chamber ensemble
  - Deux Etudes for orchestra
- Iain Hamilton
  - The Morning Watch for mixed chorus and ten wind instruments
  - La Ricordanza for tenor and orchestra
  - Symphony No. 3.Spring
  - Symphony No. 4
- Robin Holloway
  - Brand, dramatic ballet for soli, chorus, organ and orchestra
  - Clarissa Symphony for soprano, tenor and orchestra
  - The Lover's Well for bass-baritone and piano
  - Sonata for Violin Solo
- Wilfred Josephs
  - Blessings for chorus and organ
  - Eight Aphorisms for trombone octet
  - Overture The Brontes
  - Quartet Prelude in honour of Joseph Haydn
  - Spring Songs for chorus
  - String Quartet No. 4
  - Testimony for toccata and organ
- Kenneth Leighton
  - Household Pets for piano
  - These Are Thy Wonders for high voice and organ
- George Lloyd – Symphony No 10, November Journeys (for brass)
- John McCabe
  - Afternoons and Afterwards for piano
  - Desert 1: Lizard for woodwind and percussion
  - Desert II: Horizon for ten brass instruments
  - Music's Empire for soli, chorus and orchestra
- Elizabeth Maconchy
  - Little Symphony
  - Piccola Musica for violin, viola and cello
  - Trittico for two oboes, bassoon and harpsichord
- William Mathias – Rex Gloriae for unaccompanied voices
- Nicholas Maw – Flute Quartet
- Dominic Muldowney
  - In Dark Times for soli and ensemble
  - Sports et Divertissements for reciter and ensemble
- Thea Musgrave
  - An Occurrence at Owl Creek Bridge, radio opera
  - Preipeteia for orchestra
- Stephen Oliver
  - Mass for unaccompanied chorus
  - Wind Octet
- Paul Patterson – The Canterbury Psalms for chorus and orchestra
- Priaulx Rainier – Concertante for two winds (oboe, clarinet) and orchestra
- John Tavener
  - Funeral Ikos for chorus
  - The Great Canon of the Ode to Saint Andrew of Crete for chorus
  - Mandelion for organ
  - Prayer for the World for sixteen solo voices
  - Trisagion for brass quintet
- Adrian Williams – String Quartet No. 2
- Malcolm Williamson
  - Fountainbleau Fanfare, for brass, percussion and organ
  - Josip Broz Tito for baritone and orchestra
  - Mass of the People of God

== Opera ==
- Iain Hamilton – Anna Karenina
- Jonathan Harvey – Passion and Resurrection, a church opera, fp. Winchester Cathedral.

== Musical theatre ==
- 11 May – Cats, with music by Andrew Lloyd Webber, opens in London's West End.
- 16 December – Alan Ayckbourn's Making Tracks, with music by Paul Todd, opens at the Stephen Joseph Theatre, Scarborough.

== Musical films ==
- Concert for Kampuchea
- Dance Craze
- Urgh! A Music War

== Births ==
- 11 January
  - Jamelia, singer
  - Tom Meighan, lead singer of Kasabian
- 22 January – Sarah Davies, bassist (Hepburn)
- 19 January – Thaila Zucchi, singer (allSTARS*) and actress
- 28 January – Jamie Tinkler, singer (Pop!, Avenue)
- 24 February – Gwilym Simcock, pianist and composer
- 11 March – Russell Lissack, guitarist with Bloc Party
- 13 March – Ivo Neame, jazz pianist and saxophonist
- 20 March – Declan Bennett, singer (Point Break)
- 26 March – Jay Sean, singer
- 1 April – Hannah Spearritt, actress and singer (S Club 7)
- 2 April – Linzi Martin, singer (Girl Thing)
- 10 April – Liz McClarnon, singer (Atomic Kitten)
- 21 April – Mike Christie, baritone (G4)
- 26 April – Ms Dynamite, singer
- 4 May – Ryan Elliott, singer (Ultimate Kaos)
- 5 May – Craig David, singer
- 20 May – Sean Conlon, musician (5ive)
- 22 May – Su-Elise Nash, singer (Mis-Teeq)
- 23 May
  - Gwenno Saunders, singer
  - Tayo "Flawless" Aisida, Nigerian-born singer (Big Brovaz)
- 5 June – Anika Bostelaar, Dutch-born singer (Girl Thing)
- 20 June – Derek McDonald, singer (Mero)
- 22 June – Chris Urbanowicz, guitarist (Editors)
- 23 June – Antony Costa, singer (Blue)
- 27 June – Colin and Joe O'Halloran, Irish singers (Reel)
- 6 July – Vicky Palmer, singer (Boom!)
- 12 July – Rebecca Hunter, singer (allSTARS*)
- 19 July – Didz Hammond, singer and bass player (Dirty Pretty Things and The Cooper Temple Clause)
- 24 July – Lisa Lister, guitarist (Hepburn)
- 8 August – Bradley McIntosh, singer (S Club 7)
- 11 August – Sandi Thom, singer-songwriter
- 21 August – Jenilca Giusti, Puerto Rican-born singer (Solid HarmoniE)
- 20 September – Keith Semple, singer (One True Voice)
- 29 September – Suzanne Shaw, singer (Hear'Say) and actress
- 6 October – Sarah Keating, Irish singer (Six)
- 10 October – Una Healy, Irish singer (The Saturdays)
- 13 October – Kele Okereke, singer (Bloc Party)
- 31 October – Liam McKenna, Northern Irish singer (Six)
- 17 November – Sarah Harding, singer (Girls Aloud)
- 20 November – Kimberley Walsh, singer (Girls Aloud)
- 22 November – Ben Adams, singer (A1)
- 26 November – Natasha Bedingfield, singer
- 19 December – Sam Bloom, singer (allSTARS*)

== Deaths ==
- 19 February
  - Olive Gilbert, actress and singer, 82
  - Frank Merrick, pianist, 95
- 21 February – Ron Grainer, Australian-born electronic music pioneer and composer involved with the BBC Radiophonic Workshop, 58 (spinal cancer)
- 10 March – Bill Hopkins, pianist, composer and critic, 37 (heart attack)
- 24 March – George Charles Gray, cathedral organist, 83
- 7 April – Kit Lambert, manager and producer, 45 (fall)
- 8 April – Eric Rogers, composer, 59
- 14 April – Christian Darnton, composer, 75
- 21 April – Ivor Newton, pianist and accompanist, 88
- 28 April – Steve Currie, bassist of T.Rex, 33 (car crash)
- 12 May – Frank Weir, orchestra leader and jazz musician, 70
- 17 May – Alan Gowen, keyboardist (Gilgamesh), 33 (leukaemia)
- 29 May – Sir John Dykes Bower, cathedral organist, 75
- 18 July – Janet Craxton, oboist, 52
- 29 July – Sydney Kyte, bandleader and violinist, 85
- 5 August – Reginald Kell, clarinettist, 75
- 29 August – Guy Stevens, band manager, record producer and DJ, 38 (overdose)
- 23 September – Sam Costa, dance band singer and DJ, 71
- 29 September – Tommy Moore, former drummer of the Beatles, 50 (brain haemorrhage)
- 30 September – Boyd Neel, orchestral conductor, 76
- 15 October – Elsie Randolph, actress, dancer and singer, 77
- 9 November – Willis Grant, cathedral organist, 74
- 13 December – Cornelius Cardew, experimental music composer, 45 (hit-and-run car accident)
- 17 December – Sybil Gordon, operatic mezzo-soprano, 79
- date unknown – Albert Ernest Sims, composer, conductor and music director of The Central Band of H.M. Royal Air Force, 85

== See also ==
- 1981 in British radio
- 1981 in British television
- 1981 in the United Kingdom
- List of British films of 1981
