= 1981 in British television =

This is a list of British television related events from 1981.

== Events ==
=== January ===
- 1 January – The Channel Four Television Company is established in preparation for the launch of Channel 4.
- 5 January
  - Debut of the BBC1 soap Triangle, a twice-weekly series set aboard a North Sea ferry and filmed on location using outside broadcast cameras. The website TVARK describes the programme as being chiefly remembered as "some of the most mockable British television ever produced" owing to its clichéd storylines and stilted dialogue as well as being notable for its troubled production. It is axed after three series in 1983.
  - The Hitchhiker's Guide to the Galaxy, the television version of Douglas Adams' radio comedy of the same name, makes its debut on BBC2.
- 20 January – BBC2 airs live coverage of the inauguration of Ronald Reagan as the 40th President of the United States.
- 22 January – The American sitcom Benson makes its UK debut on ITV.

=== February ===
- 5 February – BBC1 begins showing the American cartoon series Scooby-Doo and Scrappy-Doo.
- 10 February – Alan Rogers' cutout animation series Pigeon Street makes its debut on BBC1. The series runs until December before repeats on the BBC throughout the 1980s and 1990s until 1994.
- 13 February – Arthur Marshall makes his debut on the BBC2 game show Call My Bluff after the death of Patrick Campbell the previous November.
- 27 February – ITV shows the pilot episode of Magnum P.I. starring Tom Selleck; the first series does not commence until 23 May.

=== March ===
- 3 March – BBC1 premiered the 13 episodic Australian children's drama Children of Fire Mountain.
- 12 March – Debut of the sitcom Sorry on BBC1, starring Ronnie Corbett.
- 21 March – After an unprecedented seven years starring in Doctor Who, Tom Baker makes his final appearance as the Fourth Doctor in Part 4 of Logopolis. Peter Davison makes his first appearance as the Fifth Doctor at the conclusion of that story.
- 29 March – BBC1 airs highlights of the first London Marathon under the International Athletics strand. Live coverage of the event begins the following year.
- March – TV-am purchases a former car showroom in Camden as its headquarters. The building is subsequently renovated to create the Breakfast Television Centre.

=== April ===
- 4 April – The UK wins the 26th Eurovision Song Contest, with the song "Making Your Mind Up" by Bucks Fizz, broadcast live on BBC1 from Dublin.
- 30 April – The long-running science-fiction series Doctor Who starts airing in Sri Lanka with the first part of the seventh series Spearhead from Space which is broadcast on the Independent Television Network.

=== May ===
- 1 May – First edition of Junior Pot Black on BBC2, a younger version of the popular snooker series and would run for two years and a revival in 1991. Among the players in this year's competition which would run until 19th June was future world champion John Parrott. The champion would eventually be another future professional, Dean Reynolds.
- 17 May – Sunday Grandstand launches. It airs during the summer months on BBC Two.
- 18 May – The final episode of The Amazing Adventures of Morph airs on BBC1.

=== June ===
- 2 June – The music series Razzamatazz makes its debut on ITV; it will run for 6 years.
- 22 June – ATV announced that Crossroads actress Noele Gordon had been sacked from the soap.

=== July ===
- 04 July – BBC1 launches the long running music quiz show Pop Quiz, hosted by Mike Read.
- 27 July – In a specially timed event by the show's production team, Ken Barlow marries Deirdre Langton on Coronation Street just two days before the real-life wedding of Prince Charles and Lady Diana Spencer. The wedding of Ken and Deirdre is watched by over 24 million viewers in Britain.
- 29 July
  - The marriage of the Prince of Wales (later Charles III) and Lady Diana Spencer takes place at St Paul's Cathedral. More than 30,000,000 viewers watch the wedding on television, the second highest television audience of all time in Britain.
  - ITV shows the network television premiere of the 1977 disco-set drama Saturday Night Fever, starring John Travolta. This is the edited for television version which removes all profanity and adult themes from the original version of the film.
- 31 July – ITV begins showing Storybook International, featuring children's folk tales and fairy stories from around the world.

=== August ===
- 1 August – This week's issue of the Radio Times is not published due to a printing dispute.
- 11 August – TSW takes over Westward Television but continues to use the Westward name until 1 January 1982.
- 27 August – Moira Stuart, aged 31, is appointed as the BBC's first black newsreader.
- 31 August – The network television premiere of Richard Donner's 1976 supernatural horror film The Omen on ITV, starring Gregory Peck and Lee Remick. The following morning, newspapers report numerous complaints of viewers being horrified after the showing of the movie.
- August – Southern sells its studios to TVS but continues to use them until its franchise runs out at the end of the year.

=== September ===
- 4 September – ITV broadcasts the feature-length pilot episode of The Amazing Spider-Man, starring Nicholas Hammond.
- 5 September – BBC 1 modifies its mirror globe ident and clock with a twin-striped BBC 1 logo, which had already been seen on trailers and slides since the mid-1970s. The modified ident makes its debut at 5.10 pm, after that day's edition of Grandstand. It initially sports a muted version of the yellow-on-blue colour scheme seen on the preceding version of the ident before changing to green-on-blue two days later, a configuration that would remain until 1985.
- 7 September – BBC1:
  - Launches News After Noon as a 30-minute lunchtime news programme, replacing the much shorter Midday News.
  - Airs a two-part adaptation of the Stephen King vampire novel Salem's Lot, starring David Soul and James Mason. Part 2 is shown on 9 September.
- 8 September – BBC1 airs the first episode of the sitcom Only Fools and Horses starring David Jason and Nicholas Lyndhurst. It runs for seven series until 1991 and as Christmas specials until 2003. After a modest start, it will become one of the most-watched television shows in the UK and be voted Britain's Best Sitcom in a 2004 BBC poll.
- 9 September – Rediffusion launches a movie channel called Starview. It is allowed to launch the channel following a decision by the Home Office granting several experimental licences to broadcast subscription television and Rediffusion has won one of these licenses.
- 10 September – BBC1 broadcasts the science-fiction drama series The Day of the Triffids, based on the 1951 novel by John Wyndham.
- 16 September – Postman Pat, the children's stop-motion series about a rural postman with a black and white cat written and created by John Cunliffe and voiced and narrated by Ken Barrie makes its debut on BBC1. Episode 8 introduces a more authentic look to the Royal Mail and Post Office Ltd logos and more storybooks are produced after 13 episodes being broadcast on BBC1 and BBC2 which makes the series more popular than expected to be, starting from Christmas 1981 along with Pigeon Street.
- 21 September – BBC2 debuts the comedy sketch show A Kick Up the Eighties, launching the television career's of Tracy Ullman and Rick Mayall.
- 22 September – BBC1 begins showing the 10-part supernatural drama Dark Towers, produced for the children's educational Look and Read series.
- 26 September – ITV launches the practical joke-themed series Game for a Laugh, featuring Jeremy Beadle, Matthew Kelly, Sarah Kennedy and Henry Kelly.
- 28 September
  - ITV broadcasts the first episode of Cosgrove Hall Films' children's animated series Danger Mouse, with the lead character voiced by David Jason.
  - Debut of the darts-based game show Bullseye on ITV, presented by Jim Bowen.

=== October ===
- 3 October – TVTimes is rebranded as TVTimes Magazine, the premise for the change of name being that it now contains more than television listings.
- 8 October – ITV airs the network television premiere of Steven Spielberg's 1975 blockbuster thriller Jaws, starring Roy Scheider, Robert Shaw and Richard Dreyfuss. The film is watched by an estimated 23 million viewers, making it the most watched film of the year.
- 11 October – See Hear is launched on BBC1, initially as a series of 20 programmes. Broadcast with open subtitles It is presented in sign, thereby becoming the first regular television programme for deaf and hard-of-hearing people in the United Kingdom.
- 12 October – Brideshead Revisited, a television adaptation of Evelyn Waugh's novel of the same name, makes its debut on ITV, starring Jeremy Irons and Anthony Andrews.
- 18 October
  - BBC1 starts to air season 5 of the US drama series Dallas.
  - Debut of the long-running Jersey-set crime drama Bergerac on BBC1, starring John Nettles.
- 23 October – The last ever teatime block of Open University programmes is transmitted on BBC2 today. From the 1982 season, only a single Open University programme is aired, at 5:10pm ahead of the start of BBC2's evening programmes.
- 24 October ITV screens the British Network Television Premiere of the film The Wild Geese starring Richard Burton, Roger Moore, Richard Harris, Hardy Kruger.
- October – Scottish Television becomes the first ITV station to operate a regional ORACLE teletext service, containing over 60 pages of local news, sport and information.

=== November ===
- November – BBC2 starts its weekdays at the earlier time of 3:55pm.
- 2 November
  - The TV licence increases in price from £34 to £46 for a colour TV and £12 to £15 for black and white.
  - BBC2 begins broadcasting a season showcasing the Five Faces of Doctor Who.
  - ITV debuts the popular children's series Marmalade Atkins, starring Charlotte Coleman as the teenage rebel.
- 12 November – Noele Gordon, eight times winner of the TVTimes award for best actress, leaves Crossroads after playing Meg Richardson since the series began in 1964, having been sacked from the show.

=== December ===
- December – The BBC's Open University broadcasts begin using computer generated clocks.
- 21 December – BBC1 screens the final episode of the cult sci-fi series Blake's Seven in which the main cast are dramatically killed off in a shoot out.
- 24 December
  - ITV network premiere of the 1970 musical version of Charles Dickens' Scrooge, starring Albert Finney and Alec Guinness.
  - BBC1 launches The Kenny Everett Television Show, following Everett's departure from ITV.
- 25 December – Christmas Day network television premiere of 1979's The Muppet Movie on ITV.
- 26 December – The British television premiere of the classic epic 1939 American Civil War movie Gone with the Wind, starring Clark Gable and Vivien Leigh, on BBC1.
- 27 December – UK television premiere on ITV of the feature-length animated movie Flash Gordon: The Greatest Adventure of All. It would be shown only once more on 22 December 1983, again on ITV.
- 28 December
  - BBC1 shows the UK television premiere of The Slipper and the Rose, the 1976 musical live action film version of Cinderella, starring Richard Chamberlain.
  - The Doctor Who spin-off special K-9 and Company is shown on BBC1.
- 29 December – Pipkins is broadcast for the final time.
- 31 December – The final day on air for the ITV regional stations ATV, Southern and Westward.

=== Unknown ===
- Radio Rental Cable Television launches the UK's first pay-per-view movie channel 'Cinematel' for cable viewers in Swindon. The channel later expands to Chatham, Kent. As well as showing movies, the channel also broadcasts some local programming, including one-off documentaries and a live news-magazine programme called Scene in Swindon launches. Also provided is a local teletext service with pages about film information, horoscopes, recipes, local bus times and job vacancies.
- The original Talkback (production company) is established by comedy duo Mel Smith and Griff Rhys Jones.
- First broadcasts of Glastonbury Festival: ITV records highlights which it shows over the following weeks.

== Debuts ==
=== BBC1 ===
- 4 January – The Swiss Family Robinson: Flone of the Mysterious Island (1981)
- 5 January – Triangle (1981–1983)
- 6 January – Seconds Out (1981–1982)
- 10 January – Nanny (1981–1983)
- 11 January – Solo (1981–1982)
- 15 January – The Treachery Game (1981)
- 23 January – The Walls of Jericho (1981)
- 29 January – Partners (1981)
- 1 February – Sense and Sensibility (1981)
- 5 February – Scooby-Doo and Scrappy-Doo (1979–1982)
- 10 February – Pigeon Street (1981)
- 11 February – Break in the Sun (1981)
- 13 February – Finders Keepers (1981–1985)
- 12 March – Sorry! (1981–1982, 1985–1988)
- 25 March – The Bagthorpe Saga (1981)
- 2 April – A Spy at Evening (1981)
- 30 April – The Chinese Detective (1981–1982)
- 1 May – The Nightmare Man (1981)
- 21 May – Chock-A-Block (1981)
- 1 July
  - The Olympian Way (1981)
  - Three of a Kind (1981–1983)
- 4 July – Pop Quiz (1981–1984, 1994, 2008)
- 10 July – A Chance to Sit Down (1981)
- 25 July – Summertime Special (1981–1982)
- 7 August – The Rose Medallion (1981)
- 6 September – Blood Money (1981)
- 7 September
  - Salem's Lot (1979)
  - News After Noon (1981–1986)
- 8 September – Only Fools and Horses (1981–1983, 1985–1993, 1996, 2001–2003, 2014)
- 10 September – The Day of the Triffids (1981)
- 14 September – Willo the Wisp (1981, 2005)
- 16 September – Postman Pat (1981–1982, 1990; 1997, 2004–2008)
- 24 September – Fanny by Gaslight (1981)
- 4 October – Great Expectations (1981)
- 11 October – See Hear (1981–present)
- 18 October – Bergerac (1981–1991)
- 22 October – Tenko (1981–1985)
- 11 November – Wilfred and Eileen (1981)
- 13 November – Kessler (1981)
- 8 December – Codename Icarus (1981)
- 16 December – Present Laughter (1981)
- 24 December – The Kenny Everett Television Show (1981–1988)
- 29 December
  - Artemis 81 (1981)
  - John Diamond (1981)

=== BBC2 ===
- 4 January – The History Man (1981)
- 5 January – The Hitchhiker's Guide to the Galaxy (1981)
- 8 January – The Little World of Don Camillo (1981)
- 14 January – Sons and Lovers (1981)
- 17 February – Maggie (1981–1982)
- 4 March – The Life and Times of David Lloyd George (1981)
- 5 April – Bread or Blood (1981)
- 6 May – Private Schulz (1981)
- 9 May – Maybury (1981–1983)
- 17 May – Sunday Grandstand (1981–2007)
- 21 September – A Kick Up the Eighties (1981–1984)
- 22 September – Look and Read: Dark Towers (1981)
- 24 September – Roger Doesn't Live Here Anymore (1981)
- 29 September – Timewatch (1981–present)
- 1 October – World's End (1981)
- 2 October – Prisoners of Conscience (1981)
- 14 October – The Borgias (1981)
- 3 November – The Last Song (1981–1983)

=== ITV ===
- 1 January – Wood and Walters (1981–1982)
- 3 January – Punchlines (1981–1984)
- 4 January
  - Barriers (1981–1982)
  - Dangerous Davies: The Last Detective (1981)
- 6 January – The Ballyskillen Opera House (1981)
- 9 January – The Gaffer (1981–1983)
- 13 January – Wolcott (1981)
- 17 February – A Sense of Freedom (1981)
- 18 January – Sunday Night Thriller (1981)
- 20 January – Cover (1981)
- 21 January – Honky Tonk Heroes (1981)
- 22 January – Benson (1979–1986)
- 23 January – Second Chance (1981)
- 10 February – Bognor (1981–1982)
- 16 February – West End Tales (1981)
- 19 February – The Incredible Mr Tanner (1981)
- 22 February – Doctors' Daughters (1981)
- 27 February – Magnum, P.I. (1980–1988)
- 6 March – My Father's House (1981)
- 8 March – Seven Dials Mystery (1981)
- 31 March – Plays for Pleasure (1981)
- 1 April – Echoes of Louisa (1981)
- 2 April – Jason of Star Command (1978–1979)
- 5 April – The Smuggler (1981)
- 9 April – Get Up and Go! (1981–1983)
- 15 April – The Good Soldier (1981)
- 23 April – Funny Man (1981)
- 27 April – Chintz (1981)
- 28 April – Thicker Than Water (1981)
- 13 May – Into the Labyrinth (1981–1982)
- 22 May – Till Death... (1981)
- 2 June – Razzamatazz (1981–1987)
- 3 June – Have I Got You... Where You Want Me? (1981)
- 5 June – Misfits (1981)
- 12 June – Get Lost! (1981)
- 15 June – Sorry, I'm a Stranger Here Myself (1981–1982)
- 22 June – Scarf Jack (1981)
- 4 July – The House on the Hill (1981)
- 24 July – That Beryl Marston...! (1981)
- 31 July – Storybook International (1981–1986)
- 23 August – Miss Morison's Ghosts (1981)
- 24 August – The Member for Chelsea (1981)
- 29 August – Stay with Me Till Morning (1981)
- 1 September
  - The Flame Trees of Thika (1981)
  - Frankie Howerd Strikes Again (1981)
- 2 September – The Paul Squire Show (1981)
- 4 September – Kinvig (1981)
- 5 September – Take a Letter, Mr. Jones (1981)
- 6 September – Winston Churchill: The Wilderness Years (1981)
- 7 September – Never the Twain (1981–1991)
- 9 September – Diamonds (1981)
- 11 September – Roots: The Next Generations (1979)
- 24 September – Taff Acre (1981)
- 26 September – Game for a Laugh (1981–1985)
- 28 September
  - Bullseye (1981–1995, 2006)
  - Danger Mouse (1981–1992, 2015–2019)
  - Stig of the Dump (1981)
- 29 September
  - Rod, Jane and Freddy (1981–1991)
  - Vice Versa (1981)
- 12 October – Brideshead Revisited (1981)
- 13 October – Going Out (1981)
- 17 October – The Stanley Baxter Series (1981)
- 23 October – That's My Boy (1981–1986)
- 26 October – Astronauts (1981–1983)
- 27 October – It Takes a Worried Man (1981–1983)
- 1 November
  - Dear Enemy (1981)
  - A Fine Romance (1981–1984)
- 2 November
  - Marmalade Atkins (1981–1984)
  - Theatre Box (1981)
- 8 December – Freetime (1981–1985)
- 13 December – Celebrity Playhouse (1981)
- Unknown – Scooby-Doo and Scrappy-Doo (1980–1982)

== Channels ==
=== New channels ===
Date	Channel
9 September	Starview

== Television shows ==
=== Returning this year after a break of one year or longer ===
- 1 March – Open All Hours (BBC2 1976, BBC1 1981–1982, 1985, 2013–2019)
- 9 April – Are You Being Served? (BBC1 1972, 1973–1979, 1981, 1983, 1985, 2016)

== Continuing television shows ==
=== 1920s ===
- BBC Wimbledon (1927–1939, 1946–2019, 2021–present)

=== 1930s ===
- Trooping the Colour (1937–1939, 1946–2019, 2023–present)
- The Boat Race (1938–1939, 1946–2019, 2021–present)
- BBC Cricket (1939, 1946–1999, 2020–2024)

=== 1940s ===
- Come Dancing (1949–1998)

=== 1950s ===
- The Good Old Days (1953–1983)
- Panorama (1953–present)
- Crackerjack (1955–1984, 2020–present)
- What the Papers Say (1956–2008)
- The Sky at Night (1957–present)
- Blue Peter (1958–present)
- Grandstand (1958–2007)

=== 1960s ===
- Coronation Street (1960–present)
- Songs of Praise (1961–present)
- Animal Magic (1962–1983)
- Doctor Who (1963–1989, 1996, 2005–present)
- World in Action (1963–1998)
- Top of the Pops (1964–2006)
- Match of the Day (1964–present)
- Crossroads (1964–1988, 2001–2003)
- Play School (1964–1988)
- Mr. and Mrs. (1965–1999)
- World of Sport (1965–1985)
- Jackanory (1965–1996, 2006)
- Sportsnight (1965–1997)
- Call My Bluff (1965–2005)
- It's a Knockout (1966–1982, 1999–2001)
- The Money Programme (1966–2010)
- ITV Playhouse (1967–1982)
- Reksio (1967–1990)
- The Big Match (1968–2002)
- Nationwide (1969–1983)
- Screen Test (1969–1984)

=== 1970s ===
- The Goodies (1970–1982)
- The Old Grey Whistle Test (1971–1987)
- The Two Ronnies (1971–1987, 1991, 1996, 2005)
- Clapperboard (1972–1982)
- Crown Court (1972–1984)
- Pebble Mill at One (1972–1986, 1991–1996)
- Rainbow (1972–1992, 1994–1997)
- Emmerdale (1972–present)
- Newsround (1972–present)
- Weekend World (1972–1988)
- We Are the Champions (1973–1987)
- Last of the Summer Wine (1973–2010)
- That's Life! (1973–1994)
- Tiswas (1974–1982)
- Wish You Were Here...? (1974–2003)
- Arena (1975–present)
- Jim'll Fix It (1975–1994)
- Gambit (1975–1985, 1995)
- Multi-Coloured Swap Shop (1976–1982)
- Rentaghost (1976–1984)
- One Man and His Dog (1976–present)
- The Professionals (1977–1983)
- Ski Sunday (1978–present)
- Strangers (1978–1982)
- Butterflies (1978–1983, 2000)
- 3-2-1 (1978–1988)
- Grange Hill (1978–2008)
- Dick Turpin (1979–1982)
- Friday Night, Saturday Morning (1979–1982)
- Not the Nine O'Clock News (1979–1982)
- Only When I Laugh (1979–1982)
- Sapphire & Steel (1979–1982)
- Terry and June (1979–1987)
- The Book Tower (1979–1989)
- Blankety Blank (1979–1990, 1997–2002)
- The Paul Daniels Magic Show (1979–1994)
- Antiques Roadshow (1979–present)
- Question Time (1979–present)

=== 1980s ===
- Play Your Cards Right (1980–1987, 1994–1999, 2002–2003)
- Family Fortunes (1980–2002, 2006–2015, 2020–present)
- Into the Labyrinth (1980–1982)
- The Gentle Touch (1980–1984)
- Juliet Bravo (1980–1985)
- Cockleshell Bay (1980–1986)
- Children in Need (1980–present)

== Ending this year ==
- 1 March – Agony (1979–1981)
- 15 March – The Muppet Show (1976–1981)
- 31 March – Robin's Nest (1977–1981)
- 21 April – When the Boat Comes In (1976–1981)
- 29 April – The Life and Times of David Lloyd George (1981)
- 11 August – You're Only Young Twice (1977–1981)
- 19 August – How (1966–1981)
- 21 August – Lady Killers (1980–1981)
- 3 September – It Ain't Half Hot Mum (1974–1981)
- 10 October – Take a Letter, Mr. Jones (1981)
- 29 November – To the Manor Born (1979–1981, 2007)
- 12 December – Worzel Gummidge (1979–1981)
- 17 December – Pigeon Street (1981)
- 21 December – Blake's 7 (1978–1981)
- 29 December – Pipkins (1973–1981)
- 30 December – The Swiss Family Robinson: Flone of the Mysterious Island (1981)

== Births ==
- 19 January – Thaila Zucchi, singer and actress
- 31 January – Gemma Collins, media personality and businesswoman
- 8 February – Helen Pearson, journalist and presenter
- 10 February
  - Max Brown, actor
  - Holly Willoughby, television presenter
- 1 April – Hannah Spearritt, actress and singer (S Club 7)
- 3 May – Charlie Brooks, actress
- 9 May – Sally Carman, actress
- 2 June – Steve Brown, television presenter and wheelchair rugby player
- 5 June – Jade Goody, television personality (died 2009)
- 25 June – Sheridan Smith, actress
- 2 July – Angela Hazeldine, actress and musician
- 12 July – Rebecca Hunter, actress and singer
- 3 September – Fearne Cotton, television and radio presenter
- 21 September – Jack Ryder, actor
- 25 September – Sarah Jayne Dunn, actress
- 29 September – Suzanne Shaw, actress and singer (Hear'Say)
- 4 November – Guy Martin, motorcycle racer, mechanic and television presenter
- 10 October – Laura Tobin, broadcast meteorologist
- 9 December – Victoria Shalet, actress and psychotherapist
- 19 December – Sam Bloom, actor and singer

== Deaths ==
Date	Name	Age	Cinematic Credibility
1 January	Victor Carin	47	actor and screenwriter
12 January	Isobel Elsom	87	actress
16 January	Bernard Lee	73	actor
27 January	Roger Burford	76	screenwriter (Maigret)
26 February	Gerald Cross	69	actor
26 February	Roger Tonge	35	actor
28 February	Talbot Rothwell	64	screenwriter
4 March	Ian Engelmann	47	television producer
5 March	Totti Truman Taylor	65	actress
8 April	Eric Rogers	59	theme tune composer
15 April	Blake Butler	56	actor
24 May	Jack Warner	85	actor
13 June	Joan Benham	63	actress
18 June	Richard Goolden	75	actor
27 August	Peter Eckersley	45	television producer
30 August	Rita Webb	77	actress
4 September	David Peel	61	actor
11 September	Harold Bennett	82	actor
21 September	Nigel Patrick	69	actor
24 September	John Ruddock	84	actor
25 October	Eric Woodburn	87	actor
30 November	Val Gielgud	81	pioneer director of broadcast drama
30 October	Terry Bishop	69	television director
7 November	Arthur Lovegrove	68	actor
3 December	Joey Deacon	61	author and television personality
17 December	George Moon	72	actor

== See also ==
- 1981 in British music
- 1981 in British radio
- 1981 in the United Kingdom
- List of British films of 1981
