= Paul Terry =

Paul Terry may refer to:

- Paul Terry (cartoonist) (1887–1971), American cartoonist, screenwriter, film director and producer
- Paul Terry (footballer) (born 1979), English football midfielder
- Paul Terry (cricketer) (born 1959), English cricketer
- Paul Terry (actor) (born 1985), English former child actor
- Paul Terry (politician), member of the New Hampshire House of Representatives
