= Ashley Taylor Dawson =

English actor

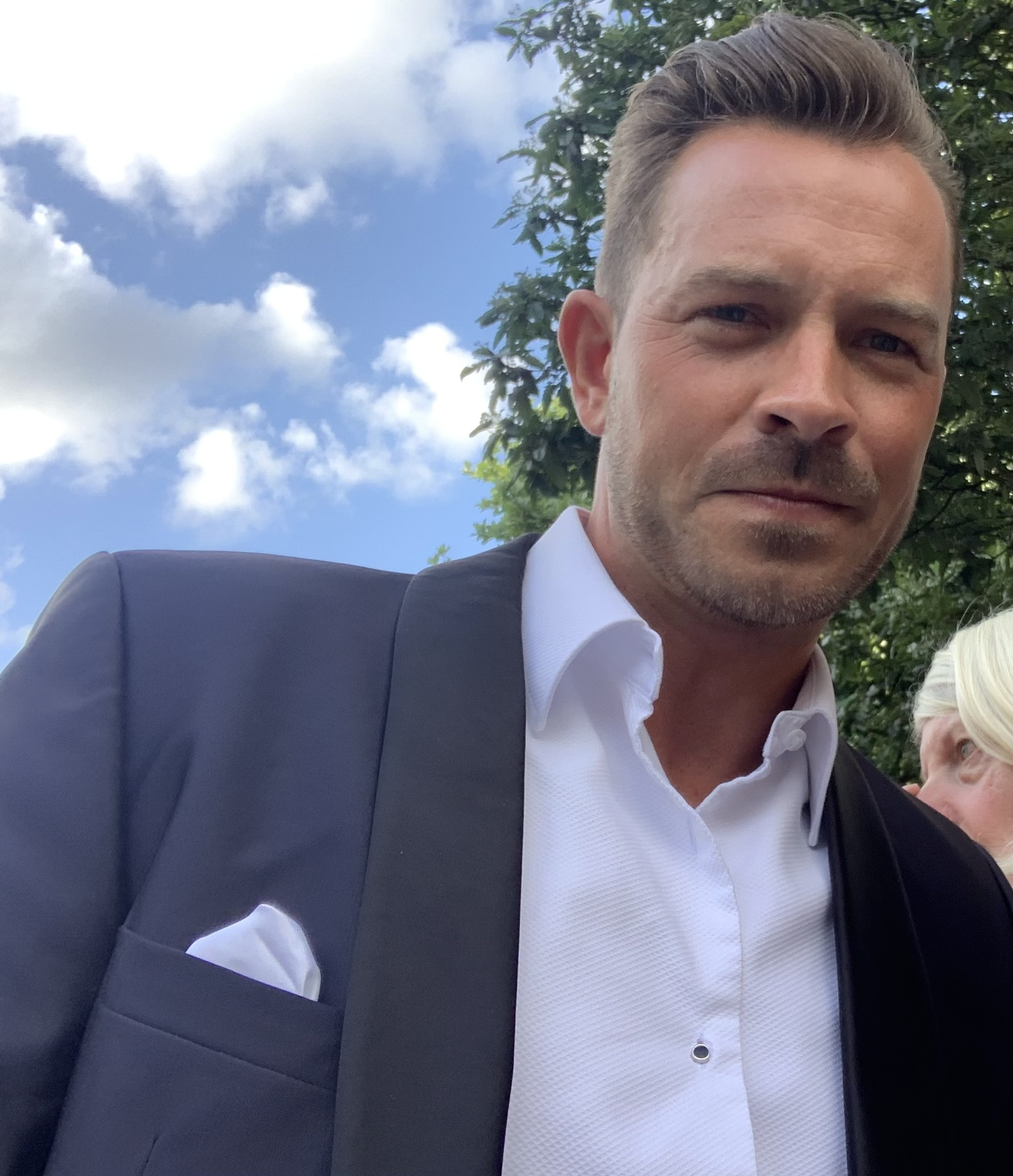
- Dawson in 2022
- Born: Philip Ashley Taylor Dawson; Manchester, England
- Occupations: Actor; singer
- Years active: 1999–present
- Television: Hollyoaks; Starstreet; Strictly Come Dancing
- Partner: Karen McKay (2004–present)
- Children: 3
- Musical career
- Genre: Pop
- Instruments: Vocals
- Years active: 2001–2014
- Label: Island
- Formerly of: Allstars

Philip Ashley Taylor Dawson, known as Ashley Taylor Dawson, is an English actor and singer. He is known for playing Darren Osborne in the Channel 4 soap opera Hollyoaks, as well as being a member of the pop group allSTARS*.

== Early life ==
Born in Manchester, Dawson grew up in Wilmslow. He attended Ashdene Primary School and Altrincham Grammar School for Boys, and began performing at a young age with the local drama group Scamps. He is the brother of singer and guitarist Catherine Taylor-Dawson.

== Career ==
Dawson has played the role of Darren Osborne in Hollyoaks since 1999. Actor Adam Booth originally played the part before leaving in 1997. The character rejoined Hollyoaks in 1999 when Dawson secured the part. Dawson joined Hollyoaks when he was 17 years old after getting his big break with the National Youth Theatre. Since then he has appeared in Hollyoaks spinoffs such as Hollyoaks Later and Tom's Life. He went on to secure the part of Darren following an audition, but soon after left in 2000 to join ALLSTARS*. Dawson re-joined the show in August 2003 after AllSTARS* split up. On playing the part Dawson said "I love playing the bad lad. He's my alter ego".

Dawson was a member of the UK pop band allSTARS*. His college best friend, Sam Bloom, called him up for an audition and invited him over. Byrne Blood Productions (Steps, A1), the management company at that time, was surprised to find that the actor could also dance and sing. Dawson eventually made it in, getting accepted and rising to fame. Dawson and Bloom also shared a flat together. Other than performing, he also appeared in allSTARS*' accompanying CITV television show, STARStreet*. Dawson was featured in other shows as well. He performed with the band on 80s Mania in 2001, and was next seen on episodes of Top of the Pops. He later made an appearance in Never Mind the Buzzcocks, Stars in Their Eyes and RI:SE. While with the group they managed to score four Top 20 singles in their two-year career.

Dawson appeared along with Darren Day in a production of Joseph and the Amazing Technicolor Dreamcoat at the Palace Theatre, Manchester, UK. As a teenager, he appeared in a number of amateur productions in his home town, including Wilmslow Guild Players' production of Jack and the Beanstalk in 1996, for which he was nominated for The Barry Phillips Award for the Most Promising Youngster (Male) in the Cheshire Theatre Guild Awards.

In September 2013, Dawson was announced as a contestant on the eleventh series of Strictly Come Dancing partnered with Ola Jordan. They were voted out in the quarter-finals, on 8 December.

In 2014, Dawson released "Playboy Bunny" on Applique Music, produced by Artful and Lempo, reached #1 on JunoDownload and #54 on ITunes, supported on Capital FM and BBC Radio One.

In January 2021, Dawson and John Junior, filmed a video with BBC Radio 5, about a suicide storyline in Hollyoaks. The storyline; When Nancy and Darren, played by Dawson, were distressed about Nancy's partner Kyle taking his own life, this stopped Junior from continuing with his suicide plans. The BBC brought them both together, so that Junior could thank Dawson for saving his life.

== Filmography ==
| Year | Title | Role | Notes |
|---|---|---|---|
| 1999–2001, 2003–present | Hollyoaks | Darren Osborne | Regular role |
| 2001–2002 | Starstreet | Ashley | Main role |
| 2009 | The Wright Stuff | Panellist | Guest |
| 2009, 2020 | Hollyoaks Later | Darren Osborne | Main role |
| 2013 | Strictly Come Dancing | Contestant | Quarter-Finalist |
| 2014 | Northern Soul | Paul | Film |
| 2014 | Tom's Life | Darren Osborne | Main role |
| 2018 | The More You Ignore Me | Mr. Desmond | Film |
| 2021 | Hollyoaks IRL | Himself | Episode 1 - Hollyoaks saved my life |

== Radio ==
| Year | Title | Role | Notes |
|---|---|---|---|
| 2021 | Hollyoaks suicide storyline saved my life | Main role | BBC Sounds podcast |

== Personal life ==
In January 2011, Dawson announced that he and long-term partner Karen McKay were expecting their first child.

== Awards and nominations ==
| Year | Award | Category | Work | Result |
|---|---|---|---|---|
| 2005 | Inside Soap Awards | Sexiest Male | Hollyoaks | |
| 2005 | Inside Soap Awards | Best Villain | Hollyoaks | |
| 2007 | Inside Soap Awards | Funniest Performance | Hollyoaks | |
| 2009 | The British Soap Awards | Best actor | Hollyoaks | Longlisted |
| 2009 | Inside Soap Awards | Funniest performance | Hollyoaks | Nominated |
| 2010 | Inside Soap Awards | Best Actor | Hollyoaks | Nominated |
| 2010 | Inside Soap Awards | Funniest Performance | Hollyoaks | |
| 2010 | Inside Soap Awards | Sexiest Male | Hollyoaks | |
| 2011 | The British Soap Awards | Sexiest Male | Hollyoaks | Nominated |
| 2014 | The British Soap Awards | Sexiest Male | Hollyoaks | Shortlisted |
| 2020 | TV Choice Awards | Best Soap Actor | Hollyoaks | Pending |
