= World Series of Dating =

- Genre: Comedy
- Written by: Andrew Dawson; Steve Dawson; Tim Inman
- Starring: Rob Riggle; Tom Price; Bentley Kalu; Thaila Zucchi
- Country of origin: United Kingdom
- Original language: English
- No. of seasons: 1
- No. of episodes: 8

Production
- Executive producers: Joff Powell; Simon Welton; Alan Tyler
- Producers: Will Innes; Abi Kelly; Mat Marsters; Jon Murphy
- Production locations: Pacific Quay Studios; Glasgow, Scotland
- Editor: Martin O'Byrne
- Production company: Lion Television

Original release
- Network: BBC Three
- Release: 26 March – 8 May 2012

World Series of Dating is a British comedic speed dating reality television show. Several young men compete to be judged best dater by four young women they date during the show. It airs on BBC Three in 30-minute episodes. It is presented by Rob Riggle, Tom Price and Thaila Zucchi. Bentley Kalu is the referee.

== Episodes ==
Episode	Air date
1	26 March 2012
2	2 April 2012
3	9 April 2012
4	16 April 2012
5	23 April 2012
6	30 April 2012
7	8 May 2012
8	8 May 2012
