= Back When / Going All the Way =

Single by allSTARS*

from the album AllSTARS*
- B-side: "Funkey"
- Released: 29 April 2002
- Genre: Pop
- Length: 3:27
- Label: Island
- Songwriters: Cathy Dennis; Mike Percy; Tim Lever
- Producers: Craig Hardy; Graham Stack; Walter Turbit

AllSTARS* singles chronology
"The Land of Make Believe" (2002)	"Back When / Going All the Way" (2002)

"Back When / Going All the Way" is the fourth single released by British pop group Allstars from their self-titled sole album. The single was released on 29 April 2002, one month before their debut album release and two months before they disbanded. The single peaked at No. 19 on the UK Singles Chart. The song "Going All the Way" appeared in the film Thunderpants (2002).

== Track listings ==
Promotional single

1. "Back When" (Xenomania mix) - 7:12

UK CD single

1. "Back When" - 3:27
2. "Going All the Way" - 3:47
3. "Back When" (Xenomania mix) - 7:12
4. "Back When" (video) - 3:29

UK cassette single

1. "Back When" - 3:27
2. "Going All the Way" - 3:47
3. "Funkey" - 3:13

Vinyl

1. "Back When" (Xenomania mix) - 7:12
2. "Back When" (radio edit) - 3:27

== Chart performance ==
Chart (2002)	Peak Position
UK Singles (OCC)	19
