= 1981 in British radio =

This is a list of events in British radio during 1981.

== Events ==
=== January ===
- 2 January – Dave Lee Travis presents his final edition of the Radio 1 Breakfast Show after two and a half years at the helm.
- 5 January – Mike Read succeeds Dave Lee Travis as presenter of the Radio 1 Breakfast Show.

=== February ===
- 11 February – BBC Radio London begins broadcasting in stereo, and begins carrying BBC Radio 1 during its mid-evening downtime on weekdays between 20.00 and 22.00. It reverts to BBC Radio 2 when Radio 1 begins its nightly 'borrow' of Radio 2's VHF frequency.
- 19 February–9 April – BBC Radio 3 makes the unusual move of broadcasting a sitcom when it airs campus comedy serial Patterson.

=== March ===
- Undated in March – Garry Richardson first presents sports news on BBC Radio 4's Today programme; he will continue in this role until 2024.

=== April to May ===
- No events.

=== June ===
- 6 June – BBC Radio 1 broadcasts a live sporting event as a one-off occurrence. The kick-off time is during Radio 1's 'borrow' of Radio 2's VHF frequencies. Radio 1 would normally be off the air on Saturday evenings, and simulcasting Radio 2, so by broadcasting the game on Radio 1's frequencies, Radio 2 is able to broadcast both the sporting event and its usual 19.00 programme.

=== July ===
- 4 July – BBC Radio Blackburn expands to cover all of Lancashire and is renamed accordingly.
- 27 July – Northsound Radio launched in Aberdeen from studios at 45 King's Gate.
- July – The Home Secretary approves proposals for the creation of Independent Local Radio services in 25 more areas.

=== August ===
- No events.

=== September ===
- 21 September – Steve Wright in the Afternoon is broadcast on BBC Radio 1 for the first time.
- 24 September – John Lade presents BBC Radio 3's Record Review for the final time. His last broadcast is the programme's 1,000th edition. Paul Vaughan takes over the programme the following week.

=== October ===
- October – BBC Radio Deeside is expanded to cover all of north east Wales and is renamed BBC Radio Clwyd
- 3 October – Kenny Everett rejoins the BBC to present a Saturday morning programme.
- 4 October – The first edition of All Time Greats, presented by Desmond Carrington, is broadcast on BBC Radio 2. The programme, broadcast on Sunday lunchtimes, remains on air until the late 2000s.
- 6–31 October – For four weeks, Radio 2’s overnight show, You and the Night and the Music, is replaced by 2’s Company with features a blend of music, drama, talks and documentaries from all the radio networks.

=== November ===
- 2 November – CB radio in the United Kingdom becomes legal (for licence holders).
- 23 November – BBC Radio Birmingham expands to cover the West Midlands, South Staffordshire, north Worcestershire and north Warwickshire and is relaunched as BBC Radio WM.

=== December ===
- Undated in December – Three months after launching, Essex Radio expands into mid-Essex when it starts broadcasting from transmitters located near Chelmsford.

== Station debuts ==
- 27 July – Northsound Radio
- 1 September – Radio Aire
- 7 September – Centre Radio
- 12 September – Essex Radio
- 15 October – Chiltern Radio
- 27 October – Radio West
- 4 December – West Sound Radio

== Programme debuts ==
- 19 February – Patterson, BBC Radio 3 (1981)
- 8 March – The Lord of the Rings (radio series), BBC Radio 4 (1981)
- 21 September – Steve Wright in the Afternoon, originally billed as Steve Wright, BBC Radio 1 (1981–1993, 1999–2022)
- Tom Menard's Local Tales, BBC Radio 2 (1981–1987)

== Continuing radio programmes ==
=== 1940s ===
- Sunday Half Hour (1940–2018)
- Desert Island Discs (1942 – present)
- Down Your Way (1946–1992)
- Letter from America (1946–2004)
- Woman's Hour (1946 – present)
- A Book at Bedtime (1949 – present)

=== 1950s ===
- The Archers (1950 – present)
- The Today Programme (1957 – present)
- Sing Something Simple (1959–2001)
- Your Hundred Best Tunes (1959–2007)

=== 1960s ===
- Farming Today (1960 – present)
- In Touch (1961 – present)
- The World at One (1965 – present)
- The Official Chart (1967 – present)
- Just a Minute (1967 – present)
- The Living World (1968 – present)
- The Organist Entertains (1969–2018)

=== 1970s ===
- PM (1970 – present)
- Start the Week (1970 – present)
- Week Ending (1970–1998)
- You and Yours (1970 – present)
- I'm Sorry I Haven't a Clue (1972 – present)
- Good Morning Scotland (1973 – present)
- Kaleidoscope (1973–1998)
- Newsbeat (1973 – present)
- The News Huddlines (1975–2001)
- File on 4 (1977 – present)
- Money Box (1977 – present)
- The News Quiz (1977 – present)
- Breakaway (1979–1998)
- Feedback (1979 – present)
- The Food Programme (1979 – present)
- Science in Action (1979 – present)

=== 1980s ===
- Radio Active (1980–1987)

== Births ==
- 13 January – Des Clarke, Scottish comedian and broadcast presenter
- 25 May – Huw Stephens, Welsh radio presenter
- 1 July – Clemency Burton-Hill, classical music presenter
- 3 September – Fearne Cotton, broadcast presenter

== Deaths ==
- 7 January – Alvar Liddell, 72, BBC Radio announcer and newsreader
- 10 February – Leonard Plugge, 91, commercial radio promoter and politician
- 15 March – Derek Roy, 58, comedian
- 13 April – Gwyn Thomas, 67, Welsh writer and broadcaster
- 23 September – Sam Costa, 71, crooner, voice actor and disc jockey
- 30 November – Val Gielgud, 81, pioneer director of broadcast drama

== See also ==
- 1981 in British music
- 1981 in British television
- 1981 in the United Kingdom
- List of British films of 1981
