= Allstars (album) =

Studio album by Allstars
- Released: 13 May 2002
- Recorded: 2001–2002
- Genre: Pop
- Length: 53:07
- Label: Island
- Producer: Peter Cunnah, Ray Hedges, Craig Hardy, Graham Stack, Walter Turbit, Mark Topham, Karl Twigg, Andrew Frampton, Chris Porter

Singles from Allstars
- 1. "Best Friends" Released: 12 June 2001; 2. "Things That Go Bump in the Night"/"Is There Something I Should Know?" Released: 10 September 2001; 3. "The Land of Make Believe" Released: 14 January 2002; 4. "Back When / Going All The Way" Released: 29 April 2002

Allstars is the only album released by British pop group Allstars. It was released on 13 May 2002 and peaked at number 43, spending only two weeks in the UK Album Charts. After that, the band parted ways with their record company, Island, and split up soon after, in June 2002. The album was re-released with a bonus remix CD. This deluxe version peaked at number 84.

== Track listing ==
Disc 1
| No. | Title | Writer(s) | Producer(s) | Length |
|---|---|---|---|---|
| 1. | "Things That Go Bump in the Night" | Peter Cunnah, Jamie Petrie | Peter Cunnah | 3:24 |
| 2. | "The Land of Make Believe" | Andy Hill, Peter Sinfield | Ray Hedges | 3:20 |
| 3. | "Back When" | Cathy Dennis, Mike Percy, Tim Lever | Craig Hardy, Graham Stack, Walter Turbit | 3:27 |
| 4. | "Love Is" | Anders Wilkstrom, Lamont Dozier, Fredrik Nils Thomander | Graham Stack | 3:37 |
| 5. | "Best Friends" | Cunnah, Petrie | Cunnah | 3:37 |
| 6. | "Happy Ever After Endings" | Cunnah, Petrie | Cunnah | 4:01 |
| 7. | "Going All the Way" | Rob Davis, Martin Ankelius, Henrik Andersson | Mark Topham, Karl Twigg | 3:47 |
| 8. | "You Got It Bad" | Lee Bennett, Ian Green | Topham, Twigg | 3:44 |
| 9. | "Tearing Up the World" | Hedges, Nigel Butler, Tracy Ackerman | Hedges | 3:26 |
| 10. | "You're a Fool" | Andrew Frampton, Chris Braide | Andrew Frampton | 2:55 |
| 11. | "Butterflies" | Frampton, Jodie Wilson, David Frank | Chris Porter | 3:20 |
| 12. | "Once upon a Lifetime" | Cunnah, Simon Ellis | Cunnah | 3:47 |
| 13. | "Lost Without You" | Cunnah, Petrie | Cunnah | 3:19 |
| 14. | "Greatest Love Story" | Cunnah, Petrie | Cunnah | 4:17 |
| 15. | "Train of Thought" | Cunnah, Petrie | Cunnah | 3:29 |
| 16. | "Is There Something I Should Know?" | Simon Le Bon, Nick Rhodes, John Taylor, Andy Taylor, Roger Taylor | Hedges | 2:57 |

Disc 2
| No. | Title | Length |
|---|---|---|
| 1. | "Best Friends" (Almighty Mix) | 7:14 |
| 2. | "Is There Something I Should Know?" (Mothership Mix) | 6:34 |
| 3. | "The Land of Make Believe" (Almighty Mix) | 6:27 |
| 4. | "Things That Go Bump in the Night" (Xenomania Mix) | 6:55 |
| 5. | "Back When" (Xenomania Mix) | 7:12 |
| 6. | "Is There Something I Should Know?" (Almighty Mix) | 8:12 |

== Charts ==
| Chart (2002) | Peak position |
|---|---|
| UK Albums (OCC) | 43 |
