= Pete Kozachik =

American cinematographer and visual effects artist

- Born: Peter Alan Kozachik; March 28, 1951; Ann Arbor, Michigan, U.S.
- Died: September 12, 2023 (aged 72); Carmel, California, U.S.
- Occupations: Cinematographer; Visual effects artist

Peter Alan Kozachik (March 28, 1951 – September 12, 2023) was an American cinematographer and visual effects artist. He was nominated for an Academy Award in the category Best Visual Effects for the film The Nightmare Before Christmas.

== Early life ==
Kozachik was born in Ann Arbor, Michigan in 1951, as the oldest of two sons. Growing up, He developed a fascination for stop-motion animation, escpecially the films The 7th Voyage of Sinbad and King Kong. Kozachik's parents separated in 1967, and Kozachik, along with his mother and younger brother, moved to Tucson, Arizona. Kozachik found work at a production company called Aztec Studios, as well as several television and radio stations throughout Tucson.

== Personal life and death ==
Kozachik married Katy Moore, a scenic painter and art teacher. His younger brother Steve Kozachik would eventually become a city councilman and the Vice Mayor for the city of Tucson.

Kozachik died on September 12, 2023, from primary progressive aphasia, at the age of 72.

== Seleceted filmography ==
- The Nightmare Before Christmas (1993; co-nominated with Eric Leighton, Ariel Velasco Shaw, and Gordon Baker)
- James and the Giant Peach (1996)
- Monkeybone (2001)
- Corpse Bride (2005)
- Coraline (2009)
