= List of British films of 1981 =

A list of films produced in the United Kingdom in 1981 (see 1981 in film):

== 1981 ==
Title	Director	Cast	Genre	Notes
1981
An American Werewolf in London	John Landis	Jenny Agutter, Griffin Dunne	Comedy/horror	
The Appointment	Lindsey C. Vickers	Edward Woodward, Jane Merrow	Horror	
Burning an Illusion	Menelik Shabazz	Cassie McFarlane, Victor Romero	Drama	
The Bushido Blade	Shusei Kotani	Richard Boone, Toshirō Mifune, Sonny Chiba	Historical drama	
Carbon Copy	Michael Schultz	Denzel Washington, George Segal	Comedy	Co-production with the US
Chanel Solitaire	George Kaczender	Marie-France Pisier, Timothy Dalton, Rutger Hauer	Biopic	
Chariots of Fire	Hugh Hudson	Ben Cross, Ian Charleson, Nigel Havers	Biopic	Winner of four Academy Awards including Best Picture
Clash of the Titans	Desmond Davis	Laurence Olivier, Harry Hamlin, Judi Bowker	Fantasy	
Concert for Kampuchea	Keith McMillan	Wings, The Clash	Musical documentary	
Condorman	Charles Jarrott	Michael Crawford, Oliver Reed, Barbara Carrera	Action/adventure/comedy	
Dance Craze	Joe Massot	The Specials, The Beat, Bad Manners	Musical documentary	
Emmanuelle in Soho	David Hughes	Angie Quick, Julie Lee and John M. East	Sex comedy	
Excalibur	John Boorman	Nigel Terry, Helen Mirren, Nicol Williamson, Nicholas Clay, Cherie Lunghi, Paul Geoffrey, Robert Addie, Gabriel Byrne, Liam Neeson, Patrick Stewart	Epic medieval fantasy	
Eye of the Needle	Richard Marquand	Donald Sutherland, Kate Nelligan	World War II	
For Your Eyes Only	John Glen	Roger Moore, Julian Glover, Carole Bouquet	Spy/action	
The French Lieutenant's Woman	Karel Reisz	Meryl Streep, Jeremy Irons, Hilton McRae	Drama	
The Good Soldier	Kevin Billington	Robin Ellis, Vickery Turner, Jeremy Brett, Susan Fleetwood	Drama	
The Great Muppet Caper	Jim Henson	Jim Henson, Frank Oz, Diana Rigg, John Cleese	Comedy	
Gregory's Girl	Bill Forsyth	John Gordon Sinclair, Dee Hepburn, Clare Grogan	Comedy	
Green Ice	Ernest Day	Ryan O'Neal, Anne Archer, Omar Sharif	Adventure	
Inseminoid	Norman J. Warren	Robin Clarke, Jennifer Ashley	Sci-fi	
Lady Chatterley's Lover	Just Jaeckin	Sylvia Kristel, Nicholas Clay	Drama Romance	
The Legend of the Lone Ranger	William A. Fraker	Klinton Spilsbury, Michael Horse	Western	Co-production with the US
Looks and Smiles	Ken Loach	Graham Green, Carolyn Nicholson	Drama	Entered into the 1981 Cannes Film Festival
Loophole	John Quested	Albert Finney, Martin Sheen, Susannah York	Thriller	
Memoirs of a Survivor	David Gladwell	Julie Christie, Christopher Guard	Sci-fi	Screened at the 1981 Cannes Film Festival
The Monster Club	Roy Ward Baker	Vincent Price, David Carradine, Donald Pleasence, Stuart Whitman	Comedy horror	
Omen III: The Final Conflict	Graham Baker	Sam Neill, Lisa Harrow, Rossano Brazzi	Horror	
Outland	Peter Hyams	Sean Connery, Peter Boyle, Frances Sternhagen	Science fiction	
Priest of Love	Christopher Miles	Ian McKellen, Janet Suzman, Ava Gardner	Biopic	
Quartet	James Ivory	Alan Bates, Isabelle Adjani, Maggie Smith	Period	
Riding High	Ross Cramer	Eddie Kidd, Irene Handl	Drama	
Time Bandits	Terry Gilliam	John Cleese, Sean Connery, Shelley Duvall	Fantasy	
Urgh! A Music War	Derek Burbidge	Various rock groups of the time	Music documentary	

== See also ==
- 1981 in British music
- 1981 in British radio
- 1981 in British television
- 1981 in the United Kingdom
