= James and the Giant Peach (film) =

1996 animated film directed by Henry Selick

- Theatrical release poster
- Directed by: Henry Selick
- Screenplay by: Karey Kirkpatrick; Jonathan Roberts; Steve Bloom
- Based on: James and the Giant Peach by Roald Dahl
- Produced by: Denise Di Novi; Tim Burton
- Starring: Paul Terry; Simon Callow; Richard Dreyfuss; Jane Leeves; Joanna Lumley; Miriam Margolyes; Susan Sarandon; Pete Postlethwaite; David Thewlis
- Narrated by: Pete Postlethwaite
- Cinematography: Pete Kozachik; Hiro Narita
- Edited by: Stan Webb
- Music by: Randy Newman
- Production companies: Walt Disney Pictures; Allied Filmmakers; Skellington Productions
- Distributed by: Buena Vista Pictures Distribution (Worldwide); Guild Film Distribution (United Kingdom)
- Release dates: April 12, 1996 (United States); August 2, 1996 (United Kingdom)
- Running time: 79 minutes
- Countries: United Kingdom; United States
- Language: English
- Budget: $38 million
- Box office: $28.9 million

James and the Giant Peach is a 1996 musical fantasy film directed by Henry Selick, based on the 1961 novel of the same name by Roald Dahl. Combining live-action and stop-motion animation, it was produced by Tim Burton and Denise Di Novi, and starred Paul Terry as James. Joanna Lumley and Miriam Margolyes played James's two self-absorbed Aunts Spiker and Sponge, respectively, and Pete Postlethwaite played the old man who gives James crocodile tongues (in the live-action segments), with Simon Callow, Richard Dreyfuss, Jane Leeves, Susan Sarandon, and David Thewlis, as well as Margolyes, voicing his insect friends in the animation sequences.

Released on April 12, 1996 in the United States, the film received highly positive reviews, with many critics praising the story and visuals. However, the film was a box office failure, grossing $28.9 million against its $38 million budget.

== Plot ==
In the summer of 1948, English boy James Henry Trotter is a young orphan having ended up in the care of his two domineering aunts Spiker and Sponge after his parents were eaten alive by a rhinoceros. One day, after rescuing a spider from his hysterical aunts, James obtains magic "crocodile tongues" from a mysterious old man, which have the power to grow anything they come into contact with to colossal size. James, running home, trips and spills the bag onto the ground; the neon, wormlike tongues leap away and into the ground underneath an old peach tree, thus growing a massive fruit that Spiker and Sponge exploit as a tourist attraction. At night, James eats through the peach to find a pit with several human-sized anthropomorphic invertebrates: Mr. Grasshopper, Mr. Centipede, Ms. Spider (the spider he saved prior), Mr. Earthworm, Mrs. Ladybug, and Mrs. Glowworm. As they hear Spiker and Sponge searching for James, Centipede cuts the stem connecting the peach to the tree and the peach rolls away to the Atlantic Ocean.

The invertebrates fly the peach to New York City with a flock of seagulls (each tied with a string to the peach stem), as James has dreamed of visiting the Empire State Building like his parents wanted to. Obstacles include a giant mechanical shark and undead skeletal pirates in the Arctic Ocean. When the group arrives, they are suddenly attacked by the tempestuous form of the rhinoceros that killed James' parents. James, though scared, gets everyone to safety and confronts the rhino before it strikes the peach with lightning. James and the peach fall to the city below, landing on the Empire State Building. After he is rescued by firefighters, Spiker and Sponge arrive and attempt to take James home and claim the peach. James tells the crowd of his amazing adventure and exposes his aunts abusive nature. Enraged at James, Spiker and Sponge attempt to attack him with stolen fire axes, but the insects arrive to save him, as Ms. Spider subdues the two aunts by wrapping them up in her silk. Spiker and Sponge are arrested for child abuse.

James introduces his friends to the crowd of onlookers, and allows the children to eat the peach. The peach pit is made into a cottage in Central Park, where James lives happily with the bugs, who form his new family. They also find success and fame; Mr. Centipede runs for New York mayor, Miss Spider organizes a nightclub, Mr. Earthworm becomes a mascot for a skin-care company, Mrs. Ladybug becomes an obstetrician, Mr. Grasshopper becomes a concert violinist, Glowworm becomes the light in the torch of the Statue of Liberty and James celebrates his ninth birthday with his new family and friends.

== Cast ==
- Paul Terry as James Henry Trotter, an orphan. Terry also voiced his animated form.
- Miriam Margolyes as Aunt Sponge, the sister of Spiker and the aunt of James who mistreats him ever since taking him in.
- Joanna Lumley as Aunt Spiker, the sister of Sponge and the aunt of James who lives with Sponge and mistreats him ever since taking him in.
- Pete Postlethwaite as the Magic Man, a man who gives James worm-like tongues and also serves as the film's narrator
- Steven Culp as Mr. Trotter, James' Father who was "eaten alive" by a rhinoceros
- Susan Turner-Cray as Mrs. Trotter, James' Mother who was "eaten alive" by a rhinoceros
- Mike Starr as a beat cop in New York City who is among the first to see the peach on the Empire State Building
- Cirocco Dunlap as a girl with a telescope who informs the beat cop about a boy being on top of the peach that landed on the Empire State Building
- Jeff Mosely as a hard hat man who rides on the top of the biggest crane in New York City when removing the peach from the Empire State Building
- Mario Yedidia as a street kid

=== Voices ===
- Simon Callow as Mr. Grasshopper
- Richard Dreyfuss as Mr. Centipede

- Jeff Bennett as Mr. Centipede (singing voice)

- Jane Leeves as Mrs. Ladybug
- Susan Sarandon as Miss Spider
- David Thewlis as Mr. Earthworm
- Miriam Margolyes as Mrs. Glowworm

== Production ==
At Walt Disney Animation Studios in the early 1980s, Joe Ranft tried to convince the staff to produce a film based on Roald Dahl's James and the Giant Peach (1961), a book that enamored him with its "liberating" material ever since he first read it in third grade. However, Disney refused for reasons of a potentially expensive and difficult animation process and the source material's weird subject matter. Ranft also tried to pitch the film to Disney through Pixar although the studio settled on a different pitch instead which became Toy Story. Among the animators exposed to the book by Ranft was Henry Selick; while he enjoyed the book and thought about adapting it to screen for several years, he understood the obstacles doing so, such as the source material's dreamy nature, episodic structure, and the reputation of other Dahl books being so agitational some parts of the world banned them.

Felicity Dahl, Roald's widow and executor of his estate, began offering film rights to the book in the summer in 1992; among those interested included Steven Spielberg and Danny DeVito.

Walt Disney Pictures acquired the film rights to the book from the Dahl estate in 1992. Brian Rosen was hired as producer by Disney for his experience in animated projects like FernGully: The Last Rainforest (1992) and live-action films such as Mushrooms (1995).

Dennis Potter was hired to write a draft. Rosen described it as "slightly black and bizarre", a tone Disney did not approve of, particularly with the sharks being Nazis. Once Potter died, Karey Kirkpatrick and Bruce Joel Rubin came in to write separate drafts, of which Kirkpatrick's was chosen. Unlike the novel, James's aunts are not killed by the rolling peach (though his parents' deaths occur as in the novel) but follow him to New York. The character Silkworm was removed to not overload on the amount of characters to animate; in the book, her purpose was limited to what Miss Spider did in the film, which was to attach the peach to several seagulls during the shark chase.

To write four songs for the movie, Selick approached Elvis Costello, who showed an interest in doing the film. Unfortunately, Disney's music division showed no interest in Costello. "Their alarms just went off, and they said, 'No, that's too weird'", said Selick. Disney suggested Randy Newman as an alternative. "I didn't want to use Randy", said Selick, "only because John Lasseter was already using him for Toy Story". Andy Partridge, the lead singer of the rock group XTC, originally wrote four songs for the film, "All I Dream Of Is a Friend", "Don't Let Us Bug Ya", "Stinking Rich Song" and "Everything Will Be All Right", "one of which was very beautiful", said Selick, but was replaced by Newman due to creative differences between Selick and Disney regarding the choice of soundtrack composer and the fact that Disney wanted to own the copyright to the songs for perpetuity.

Before the start of production, Disney and Selick debated on whether the film should be live-action or stop-motion-animated, the company skeptical of the stop-motion solution. Selick had originally planned James to be a live actor through the entire film, then later considered doing the whole film in stop-motion; but ultimately settled on entirely live-action and entirely stop-motion sequences, to keep lower costs. The film begins with 20 minutes of live-action, but becomes stop-motion animation after James enters the peach, and then live-action again when James arrives in New York City (although the arthropod characters remained in stop-motion). Like The Wizard of Oz (1939), the color palette changes when James enters the Peach to indicate he has entered a magical setting, from greys and greens to vibrant colors.

Filming began on November 15, 1994, with the live-action scenes wrapping on December 27 of that year, and the stop-motion scenes continuing until January 19, 1996. The stop-motion figurine of Jack Skellington from The Nightmare Before Christmas (also directed by Selick) was reused as Captain Jack.

=== Songs ===
All tracks are written by Randy Newman.

No.	Title	Performer(s)	Length
1.	"My Name Is James"	Paul Terry
2.	"That's the Life"	Jeff Bennett, Susan Sarandon, Jane Leeves, Miriam Margolyes, Simon Callow & David Thewlis (Paul Terry; reprise)
3.	"Eating the Peach"	Jeff Bennett, Susan Sarandon, Jane Leeves, Miriam Margolyes, Simon Callow, David Thewlis & Paul Terry
4.	"Family"	Jeff Bennett, Susan Sarandon, Jane Leeves, Miriam Margolyes, Simon Callow, David Thewlis & Paul Terry
5.	"Good News"	Randy Newman

== Release ==
The film was theatrically released on April 12, 1996.

Disney released the film worldwide except for a few countries in Europe, including the United Kingdom, where Pathé (the owner of co-producer Allied Filmmakers) handled distribution and sold the rights to independent companies. The only countries where Disney does not have control over the movie are the United Kingdom and Germany, where the film was released by Guild Film Distribution and Tobis Film respectively.

=== Box office ===
The film opened at the number 2 spot at the box office, missing out on the top spot to Primal Fear. The film took in $7,539,098 that weekend, and stayed in the top 10 for the next 5 weeks before dropping to 11th place. The film went on to gross $28,946,127 in the United States and Canada and $37.7 million worldwide, which against a budget of $38 million, made the film commercially a box office bomb.

=== Home media ===
The film was released on VHS on October 15, 1996. A digitally restored Blu-ray/DVD combo pack was released by Walt Disney Studios Home Entertainment on August 3, 2010, in the United States.

== Reception ==
The film received positive reviews during its initial release.

Though Roald Dahl refused numerous offers to have a film version of James and the Giant Peach produced during his lifetime, his widow, Liccy, approved an offer to produce a live-action version. She thought Roald "would have been delighted with what they did with James. It is a wonderful film."

Review aggregator Rotten Tomatoes gives the film a score of 91% based on reviews from 163 critics, with an average score of 7.2/10. The website's critical consensus states: "The arresting and dynamic visuals, offbeat details and light-as-air storytelling make James and the Giant Peach solid family entertainment." Metacritic, which uses a weighted average, lists the film with a weighted average score of 78 out of 100 based on 36 critics, indicating "generally favorable" reviews. Audiences polled by CinemaScore gave the film an average grade of "A-" on an A+ to F scale.

Owen Gleiberman of Entertainment Weekly gave the film a positive review, praising the animated part, but calling the live-action segments "crude". Writing in The New York Times, Janet Maslin called the film "a technological marvel, arch and innovative with a daringly offbeat visual conception" and "a strenuously artful film with a macabre edge."

=== Awards and nominations ===
The film was nominated for an Academy Award for Best Music, Original Musical or Comedy Score, composed by Randy Newman. It won Best Animated Feature Film at the Annecy International Animated Film Festival.

Year	Award	Category	Nominee	Result
1996	Annie Awards	Best Animated Feature		Nominated
1996	Annie Awards	Best Individual Achievement: Directing	Henry Selick	Nominated
1996	Annie Awards	Best Individual Achievement: Music	Randy Newman	Nominated
1996	Annie Awards	Best Individual Achievement: Producing	Tim Burton; Denise Di Novi	Nominated
1996	Annie Awards	Best Individual Achievement: Storyboarding	Joe Ranft	Nominated
1996	Annie Awards	Best Individual Achievement: Voice Acting	Richard Dreyfuss	Nominated
1996	Annie Awards	Best Individual Achievement: Writing	Karey Kirkpatrick; Jonathan Roberts; Steve Bloom	Nominated
1996	Kansas City Film Critics Circle Awards	Best Animated Film		Won
1997	Academy Awards	Best Music, Original Musical or Comedy Score	Randy Newman	Nominated
1997	Annecy International Animated Film Festival	Best Animated Feature Film	Henry Selick	Won
1997	Chicago Film Critics Association	Best Original Score	Randy Newman	Nominated
1997	Dallas–Fort Worth Film Critics Association	Best Animated Film		Won
1997	Satellite Awards	Best Motion Picture, Animated or Mixed Media	Tim Burton; Denise Di Novi	Nominated
1997	Saturn Awards	Best Fantasy Film		Nominated
1997	Young Artist Awards	Best Family Feature – Animation or Special Effects		Won
1997	Young Artist Awards	Best Performance in a Voiceover – Young Artist	Paul Terry	Nominated

== Potential remake ==
In August 2016, Sam Mendes was revealed to be in negotiations with Disney to direct another live action adaptation of the novel, with Nick Hornby in talks for the script. In May 2017, however, Mendes was no longer attached to the project due to his entering talks with Disney about directing a live-action film adaptation of Pinocchio, which he would also drop out on with Robert Zemeckis taking his place.
