= Microsoap =

Television series

- Genre: Live-action; Children's television Comedy
- Starring: Rebecca Hunter; Paul Terry; Suzanne Burden; Jeff Rawle; Ivan Kaye; Ryan Cartwright; Lucy Evans; Albey Brookes
- Theme music composer: Tony Flynn
- Opening theme: "Microsoap Theme"
- Country of origin: United Kingdom
- Original language: English
- No. of seasons: 4
- No. of episodes: 26

Production
- Running time: 24 minutes
- Production companies: BBC; Walt Disney Television International

Original release
- Network: BBC1 (CBBC); Disney Channel
- Release: 1998 – 2000

Microsoap is a children's sitcom, co-written by Mark Haddon and produced by the BBC in association with Disney Channel. A total of 26 episodes were made, lasting over four series, and airing from 1998 to 2000. It starred Suzanne Burden, Ivan Kaye, Paul Terry, Jeff Rawle and Rebecca Hunter. The program aired in the UK, the US, and internationally.

The story is based around the lives of two children, Joe and Emily Parker, who are brother and sister. The series begins with the split of their parents, Colin and Jane, who decide their marriage is not working. They don't want to make life for their children difficult, so they remain friends while each dates someone else. This forms the beginning background story for the series.

The series producer for all episodes was Andy Rowley. Directors were Juliet May, Baz Taylor and Graeme Harper; and the original sets were designed by Peter Findley.

== Series overview ==
The story is based around the lives of two children, Joe and Emily Parker, who are brother and sister. The series begins with the split of their parents, Colin and Jane, who decide their marriage is not working. They don't want to make life for their children difficult, so they remain friends.

Jane begins to see a builder named Roger Smart, a single parent of three children: David, Felicity and Robbie. They move in next door, and Roger knocks through a wall making one big house. Meanwhile, Colin sees Jennifer, the marriage therapist he and Jane used. This series of events forms the background story for each subsequent episode of the series.

Season	# of episodes	Date originally aired
1	7	30 Sept 1998
2	6	1999
3	6	1999
4	7	2000

== Character summaries ==
=== Main characters ===
==== Emily Parker ====
Played by Rebecca Hunter, Emily is the eldest of the two Parker children, a fifteen-year-old, football-mad girl trying to survive the madness of the combined family unit. She finds herself several love interests over the course of the series, none particularly successful, and often escapes the chaos by chatting to her best friend, Lisa, on the phone. Together with her brother Joe, they introduce and narrate each episode of the series by occasionally breaking the fourth wall and explaining the mad goings-on.

==== Joe Parker ====
Played by Paul Terry, Joe is Emily's cheeky twelve-year-old brother, keen on history and science. He has a colourful imagination, keeps a pet boa constrictor in his room, and is often to be found working on pet projects involving science, occasionally with his best friend Toby. He and his sister mostly get on well, and largely consider themselves to be the only sane people in the house. Though Joe is more impulsive and doesn't always think before blurting out what he thinks which can make things awkward for the two. Joe is also less of a reliable narrator often exaggerating or inventing things. His sister normally makes him tell the truth to the audience however.

==== Jane Parker ====
Played by Suzanne Burden, Jane is the matriarch of the household who separated from her husband Colin after the differences in their personality brought about the break-up of their marriage; after Colin moved out, she began a new relationship with Roger, whom she met at the hospital where she works long hours as a nurse in the A&E department. A workaholic who often covers the night shift, she is nonetheless able to steer the family forward and put her foot down when necessary.

==== Colin Parker ====
Played by Jeff Rawle, Colin is a computer programmer, and father to Emily and Joe. After their separation, Colin found a new flat nearby, and Emily and Joe visit him for half of the week, and stay at home for the remainder. By stark contrast to Jane, the family know him to be somewhat predictable, preferring routine rather than trying out new activities. After getting depressed with jealousy over Roger, he begins to listen to more modern music and taking more active pastimes with Joe and Emily, including going on roller coasters, attending football matches and rock concerts, hiking, kite-flying, bike-riding and rock-climbing in order to vie for their affections. This is until he is involved in a fight after a night of clubbing after a date. He begins dating other women including Joe's P.E. teacher Miss Jill Cottingham, before finally dating Jennifer, the family therapist and marries her soon after with their honeymoon in Cornwall. Colin's work takes him all over the world and he is paid very handsomely.

==== Roger Smart ====
Played by Ivan Kaye, Roger became the sole head of the Smart family when his wife left to "find herself" in Goa, and began dating Jane after his accident put him in the hospital where she worked. He later purchased the house next door and, being a builder/decorator by trade, knocked through the wall in the living room to make one larger house.

==== David Smart ====
Played by Ryan Cartwright, David is the eldest of the children, at sixteen years old; a typical lazy and occasionally rude teenager, particularly to the younger children. His main interests are his music, though he is not particularly good, and trying to impress girls. Not long after meeting the Parkers, he found he had a crush on Emily, but quickly dealt with his feelings after she said that it would never work between them, as they had begun to live as a family unit. Later, he forms a relationship with Lisa

==== Felicity Smart ====
Played by Lucy Evans, Felicity is the middle child of the Smarts and is known amongst the family for her annoying ability to talk non-stop, even talking in her sleep about her proposed future pony "Fluff". Though she often flips between hobbies, she shows an interest in many typically girly activities, such as horse-riding, cookery and setting up her own library.

==== Robbie Smart ====
Played by Albey Brookes, Robbie is the youngest of all the children, at nine years old. With a vivid imagination, Robbie is often to be found playing around the house, and chatting to his "invisible friend" Pogo, a giant seven-foot blue mouse that follows him everywhere and that nobody except he (and the viewer) can see.

=== Recurring characters ===
==== Jennifer ====
Played by Lou Gish, Jennifer is the Parker family's therapist that they began seeing after Colin and Jane's marriage ran into difficulty; after their separation, she began to date Colin, and they married not long after. Jennifer is a very caring, understanding woman; these qualities, plus her obsessive-compulsive behavior with cleanliness, drive Emily mad for a time. Jennifer finds the chaos of the two families bewildering.

==== Jim ====
Played by Scott Hickman, Jim was Emily's first love interest, though he was completely oblivious. His off-and-on relationship with his girlfriend exasperated Emily, who was never able to express her interest before Jim moved to Motherwell for the better job opportunities to be found there.

==== Toby ====
Played by Stephen Geller, Toby is Joe's best friend, who shares similar interests in science.

==== Lisa ====
Played by Shauna Shim, Lisa is Emily's best friend, who was often heard on the phone before making her first appearance. She works as a babysitter and eventually forms a relationship with David.

==== Pogo ====
Played by Sarah Mogg, Pogo is a seven-foot blue mouse that only Robbie (and the viewer) can see, and who follows him everywhere he goes. Though family members often comment on Pogo being imaginary, Robbie becomes exasperated and assures them he is only "invisible". Assumed by everyone to be imaginary, one of Emily's dates was actually able to see Pogo. Robbie also meets a girl at Colin's wedding who also has an invisible friend, a female mouse.

==== Package ====
Package is the family dog, who they found as a puppy on their doorstep.

== Awards ==
- BAFTA Awards 1999 – Best Children's Drama
- Royal Television Society 1999 – Best Children's Drama
- Prix Jeunesse International 2000 – Best Fiction for 11- to 15-year-olds

== Novelisations ==
Following the success of the television show's first season, two novels were published in 1999. Both are based on the original scripts by Mark Haddon, with writing by Stephen Cole and illustrations by Philip Thompson and Atholl McDonald. They were published by BBC Books and are fully endorsed by both the BBC and The Disney Channel.

- Microsoap: My Dad Is An Armed Robber (ISBN 0-563-55618-8) is a novelisation of episodes 1 and 2 of the first season.
- Microsoap: Lodgers From Hell (ISBN 0-563-55619-6) is a novelisation of the 3rd and 4th episodes of the first season.

The novels are written in a first-person narrative style, with Emily and Joe sharing the role. The switch between the narrators is always signified by a change in the type-face.

== Sources ==
- Fry, Andy (1 October 1998). "Microsoap". Kidscreen.
- Lewisohn, Mark (2003). Radio Times Guide to TV Comedy. BBC Books. ISBN 0-563-48755-0.
