= Starstreet (TV series) =

- Also known as: STARStreet*
- Starring: Sam Bloom; Thaila Zucchi; Ashley Taylor Dawson; Rebecca Hunter; Sandi Lee Hughes
- Country of origin: United Kingdom
- Original language: English
- No. of series: 2
- No. of episodes: 26

Production
- Running time: 15 minutes
- Production companies: Carlton Television & Byrne Blood Productions

Original release
- Network: ITV (CITV)
- Release: 2001 – 2002

STARStreet* is a British children's television series, starring the pop group allSTARS*. The 'STARS' in allSTARS* and STARStreet* represents the first letter of each member's name – Sandi, Thaila, Ashley, Rebecca and Sam. The series saw the band living together in a fictional crazy colourful house, where anything out of the ordinary could happen. It was produced for two series by Carlton Television, in association with Byrne Blood Productions. The first series first aired as part of the ITV children's Saturday morning show, SMTV Live in 2001. Due to its success, the first series was later repeated on CITV. The second series aired on CITV in 2002. Production of STARStreet* was cancelled in 2002 due to the allSTARS* splitting up.

== Media releases ==
=== STARStreet* – Vol.1: Best Friends (VHS) ===
- Best Friends
- Lost Little Things
- Butterflies
- Deja Vu
- The Greatest Love Story
- + The Making of STARStreet featurette.

=== STARStreet* – Vol.2: Thaila's Birthday (VHS) ===
- Thaila's Birthday
- Cold Sweat
- Ashley's Head
- The Wrong Side

The remaining four episodes of the first series, along with the entire second series, were never released onto VHS. To date, there have been no releases on DVD.

== Episodes ==
=== Series 1 (2001) ===
- Best Friends
- Lost Little Things
- Cold Sweat
- Butterflies
- Déjà Vu Found
- Thaila's Birthday
- The Greatest Love Story
- Inside Ashley's Head
- Makeover Madness
- The Hot Ticket
- The Wrong Side
- Becky Who?
- Happy Ever After

=== Series 2 (2002) ===
- Tiny Planet
- Ba Da Bing
- Back to the Future
- Shop Till You Drop
- Pants on Fire
- Reality TV
- Spin Cycle
- Video Nasty
- Ask Ash Lost
- Time Out
