= Ian Engelmann =

Ian Franklin Manson Engelmann (27 April 1933 – 4 March 1981) was a noted BBC television producer of such programmes as Great Orchestras of the World and The Last Night of the Proms.

A nephew of Franklin Engelmann, Engelmann as a child became a chorister at the Choir of Chichester Cathedral in Chichester, Sussex. He later attended St Paul's School, London.

As an adult, Engelmann joined the BBC as a studio manager in Radio Light Entertainment. He later transferred to BBC Television, where he specialised in light music, including Top of the Pops. In 1966, Engelmann joined the Music and Arts Department.

== Early career ==
While at Music and Arts, Engelmann developed his talents for both studio and film production, soon becoming one of the leading practitioners in his field. He had a talent for matching the appropriate image to his music, and a gift for finding common ground between the world of the professional musician and the general public.

Engelmann's programmes for the BBC Omnibus series included filmed portraits of Shostakovich, Pavarotti, and Plácido Domingo. He also created programmes featuring The Wandsworth School Boys' Choir, the Trinidad Steel Band and a programme on Prime Minister Edward Heath titled The Other Edward Heath.

== Awards and recognition ==
Engelmann's film on Pavarotti, King of the High Cs was critically acclaimed and his film Music After Mao, about Vladimir Ashkenazy in Shanghai, was the BBC entry for the 1980 Prix Italia. In 1980 Engelmann won a coveted British Academy Award (BAFTA) for his 1979 live broadcast production of the Last Night of the Proms in the category of Best Actuality Coverage.

== Personal life ==
In 1970 Engelmann formed his own choir, The Ian Engelmann Singers,, which continued to tour after his death.

Engelmann was a passionate dinghy sailor and was for many years the commodore of the BBC Ariel Sailing Club (based at the Tamesis Club in Teddington, London.)

== Filmography ==
Sources: in addition a full list of all accredited BBC Television Programmes can be found on this link:

Title	Year	Credit
Ninety Years On	1964	Production Team Member
Great Orchestras of the World: Music on Two	1967	Producer
Top Brass	1968	Producer
Don't Stop the Carnival	1969	Producer
The Other Edward Heath	1970	Producer
Music Scrapbook	1971	Producer
Six Healthy Englishmen	1973	Producer
Music from the Flames	1974	Producer
The Great Orchestras	1975	Director
Jonathan Miller	1976	Producer
Hear Hear Hoffnung	1976	Director
A Little Night Music	1977	Producer
Vladimir Ashkenazy	1977	Producer
Tom Stoppard	1977	Producer
Janet Baker	1977	Producer
Mia Farrow and Julie Andrews	1977	Producer
Young Musician of the Year 1978	1978	Producer
Sir Robert Mayer 100th Birthday Concert	1979	Producer
King of the High C's	1979	Producer
Andre Previn's Music Night	1979	Producer
The Last Night of the Proms	1979	Director
Music after Mao - Ashkenazy in China	1979	Producer
Final of the Piano Class	1980	Producer
Plácido Domingo's Christmas Choice	1980	Producer
Victorian Ballads	1980	Director
Last Night of the Proms	1980	Producer
The Merry Widow	1980	Director
Andre Previn and Friends	1981	Producer
