= A. E. Sims =

British conductor and composer

Albert Ernest Sims
- Born: 1896
- Died: 1981 (aged 84–85)
- Era: 20th century

Wing Commander Albert Ernest Sims LVO OBE (1896–1981), nicknamed George, was a British composer, conductor, and director of music of the Central Band of the Royal Air Force.

Sims was born in 1896 in Newton Heath, Manchester.

He studied music theory, composition and conducting at the Royal Academy of Music in London and then at the Royal College of Music, also in London. He was commissioned a flying officer (director of music) from warrant officer rank in 1938 and retired with the rank of wing commander. He composed several marches for band including the official march of the Royal Air Force College.

== Compositions ==
- 1950: "March of the Royal Air Forces Association"
- 1950: "R. A. F. General Salute ... Advance in Review Order"
- "Royal Air Force College March"
- "Superna Petimus"
