= Allstars (group) =

2001–2002 British pop band

allSTARS*
- Origin: United Kingdom
- Genres: Pop
- Years active: 2001–2002
- Label: Island
- Past members: Sam Bloom; Thaila Zucchi; Ashley Taylor Dawson; Rebecca Hunter; Sandi Lee Hughes

Allstars (stylised allSTARS*) were a British pop group, who were active between 2001 and 2002, achieving some chart success in the UK. The band consisted of Sam Bloom, Thaila Zucchi, Ashley Taylor Dawson, Rebecca Hunter and Sandi Lee Hughes, the initial letters of each of the band members' names making up the "STARS" in the group's name. They had their own television show, STARStreet*, on CITV between 2001 and 2002.

== Formation and split ==
The group managed to score four top 20 singles in a year. The first was "Best Friends", which peaked at No. 20 in June 2001. The second was a double A-side of their own track "Things That Go Bump in the Night" and a cover of Duran Duran's "Is There Something I Should Know?", with the former track later appearing on the soundtrack to the first Scooby-Doo film. The single reached No. 12 in September 2001.

Their third single, released in January 2002, was another cover, this time of Bucks Fizz's "The Land of Make Believe", and it gave them their first and only top 10 hit, reaching No. 9. Their fourth single, released in late April 2002, was another double A-side, but this time both were original tracks, "Back When" and "Going All the Way", the latter appearing on the soundtrack to the film Thunderpants. This however reached No. 19, and when their self-titled debut album only managed to peak at No. 43 – spending only 2 weeks on the UK Albums Chart, the group parted ways with their record company Island, and split up soon after, in June 2002. The album was later re-released with a bonus remix CD.

The group appeared in their own television programme STARStreet* which aired on ITV1's CITV block where they played fictionalised versions of themselves living inside a supernatural house. The show's theme tune was "Best Friends" and in each episode the group would perform one of their songs. The first series aired in early 2001 and was often repeated on CITV throughout the year and the second series aired in spring 2002. The series ended when the group split up. STARStreet* also aired in Canada on Vrak.tv as S.T.A.R.S in French.

Before the group split up, there was a soundtrack album from STARStreet*, which was going to be released however, due to the group splitting up, the album titled STARStreet: The Music was cancelled.

== After Allstars ==
- Thaila Zucchi did some presenting work in the Meridian region of ITV, which included announcing the regional results for Record of the Year in 2003. In 2005, she played the Bunny Boiler character in Channel 4's Balls of Steel. In 2006, she was one of the lead characters in Channel 4's Star Stories. She also appeared as "fake" housemate Pauline in Big Brother 8 but was evicted after the other housemates found out she was a fake housemate. In the summer of 2007, she appeared in an advert for Setanta Sports with Des Lynam. She played minor roles in Shameless and Hollyoaks Later in 2013 and in 2017 starred in the Dominic Brunt film Attack of the Adult Babies.
- Rebecca Hunter played Melanie in the Channel Five soap opera Family Affairs from 2003 to 2005. She got married in 2007 and moved to California. She has two children; a son born in 2010 and a daughter born in 2013.
- Ashley Taylor Dawson returned to playing the role of Darren Osborne in Channel 4's Hollyoaks in 2003, having previously left the role when he joined Allstars. In 2010, he was nominated for three British Soap Awards. He is engaged to Karen McKay and they have two sons, Buddy Mac and Mason Taylor Dawson. He also appeared on Strictly Come Dancing with partner Ola Jordan in 2013.
- Sandi Lee Hughes has kept a low profile since the group's split. She married children's TV presenter Dominic Wood in 2005 and the couple appeared on ITV1's All Star Mr & Mrs in May 2008. They have two sons, Tommy and Sam.
- Sam Bloom appeared in minor roles in The Last Detective and Kerching! in the mid-2000s before embarking on a short stage career. In 2009, he co-founded Inspiring Interns, an award-winning recruitment agency for interns and graduates in Central London.

== Discography ==
=== Albums ===
Title	Album details	Peak chart position
Title	Album details	UK
AllSTARS*	Released: 13 May 2002; Label: Island; Formats: CD	43
Starstreet: The Music	Released: 10 Jul 2002; Label: Island; Formats: CD	

=== Singles ===
Year	Title	Peak positions		Album
Year	Title	UK	AUS	Album
2001	"Best Friends"	20	91	AllSTARS*
2001	"Things That Go Bump in the Night" / "Is There Something I Should Know?"	12	-	AllSTARS*
2002	"The Land of Make Believe"	9	-	AllSTARS*
2002	"Back When / Going All the Way"	19	-	AllSTARS*
