= Rebecca Hunter =

British actress and singer

- Born: 12 July 1981 (age 45); Northampton, Northamptonshire, England
- Education: London Academy of Music and Dramatic Art
- Occupations: Actress, Singer
- Years active: 1998–2008

Rebecca Hunter, sometimes credited as Becky Hunter (born 12 July 1981), is a British actress and singer.

Hunter was born in Northampton and has a diploma in acting from the London Academy of Music and Dramatic Art. She played Melanie Costello on the Channel five soap opera Family Affairs between 2003 and 2005. Prior to this, she was a member of the pop group allSTARS* and appeared on the accompanying CITV series STARStreet*. allSTARS* were a pop act aimed predominantly at younger, pre-teen fans, and achieved moderate success in their short career, with four top twenty UK hit singles – including a cover of Bucks Fizz's single "The Land of Make Believe", reaching #9.

Her first TV role was on the Disney-produced, BAFTA award-winning CBBC sitcom Microsoap, alongside Paul Terry, Jeff Rawle and Ryan Cartwright, between 1998 and 2000. She has also appeared in My Dad's the Prime Minister and UGetMe. In addition, while a member of allSTARS*, she made an appearance as a guest on Never Mind the Buzzcocks in 2001.

In 2008, Hunter was part of the BBC series Paradise or Bust, chronicling the Tribewanted eco project in Fiji.
