= Thaila Zucchi =

British singer and actress (born 1981)

- Born: Thaila Lucia Zucchi; 19 January 1981 (age 45); Swindon, Wiltshire, England
- Occupations: Actress, singer

Thaila Lucia Zucchi (Italian: [ˈtaila luˈtʃiːa dˈdzukki; tˈtsuk-]; born 19 January 1981) is a British singer and actress of English and Italian descent. She began her career as a member of the British band allSTARS* before transitioning into acting, appearing in Big Brother 8 in the UK, where she played the part of fake Australian housemate Pauline. She has also appeared in Balls of Steel and Star Stories, as well as the TV series Blandings.

== Music career ==
Zucchi was a member of allSTARS*, a band that started out on the children's television show STARStreet (shown on CITV). She performed in more than twenty arenas around the UK, and on Top of the Pops, CD:UK, and SMTV numerous times. The band was contracted to Island Records and enjoyed four top 20 hits and released an album, with tracks that were featured in the movies Thunderpants and Scooby Doo. Zucchi remains close friends with the other band members.

== Television career ==
Zucchi appeared in Channel 4's Balls of Steel. Her role on the show is known as the Bunny Boiler. She would find a man in a public place with his partner, and outrageously flirt with him to antagonise his partner. Her other television credits include The IT Crowd, Massive Balls of Steel, Popworld, Hyperdrive, and as a presenter for Nickelodeon and The Record of the Year. In 2006 and 2007, she had several roles in the Channel 4 comedy series Star Stories, including Courteney Cox, Sharon Osbourne, and also Geri Halliwell in Simon Cowell – My Honesty, My Genius.

In 2007, Zucchi entered the Big Brother UK house, pretending to be Pauline, a housemate from Australian Big Brother. She was working secretly for Big Brother as a mole, going to and from the house to appear on Big Brother's Little Brother. She presented Big Brother's Big Mouth, another spin-off show from 17–20 July 2007, as part of the lineup replacing ex-'Big Mouth' presenter, Russell Brand. Zucchi also appeared in a DOE advertisement about the dangers of drunk driving, and in adverts for Hula Hoops, Setanta Sports and Brunchettas.

In 2007, Zucchi appeared in an episode of sitcom Not Going Out as lap-dancer Rosie. She appears in season 2 of Strutter on MTV. She has presented a show on Virgin 1 called "Boob Envy" about how women see their breasts, during which she revealed she has 'permanently erect nipples', and is also part of the presenting team of Sky One's Brainiac and the cast of the second series of Touch Me, I'm Karen Taylor for BBC Three. In 2009, she played a small role in one episode of Skins and an episode of Law & Order: UK broadcast on ITV on 23 September 2010. She is also in Richard Hammond's Blast Lab and presents the "How Hard is Your Thing?" segment in Brainiac: Science Abuse.

Zucchi acted in Coming of Age in one episode as a French teacher which was first shown on 26 January 2010, has appeared in the series Frankie Boyle's Tramadol Nights, which started airing on 30 November 2010 and has starred in adverts for Sky Broadband. She acted in several sketches in Charlie Brooker's How TV Ruined Your Life. She appears in BBC reality TV series World Series of Dating as fictional host Poppy Weathers, which started airing on 26 March 2012. In January 2013 she played Paquita Manganara in BBC One's comedy series Blandings.

She appeared as Police Sergeant Randall in the Channel 4 show Shameless.

== Filmography ==
=== Film ===
Year	Title	Role	Notes
2014	Gone	Lisa	Short film
2016	Hi-Lo Joe	Sarah	
2017	The Hippopotamus	Mrs. Vance	
2017	Attack of the Adult Babies	Barbara	
2019	Purge of Kingdoms	Kim Kardashian	
2022	Scream of the Wolf	Fiona	
2023	Evie	Lilly	
2024	I Bring Joy	Crissie	

=== Television ===
Year	Title	Role	Notes
2001–2002	Starstreet	Thaila	23 episodes (series 1 and 2)
2005–2008	Balls of Steel	Herself / Bunny Boiler	8 episodes (series 1–3)
2006	The IT Crowd	Sophia	Episode: "The Haunting of Bill Crouse"
2006–2008	Star Stories	Various celebrities	14 episodes (series 1–3)
2007	Hyperdrive	Commander Gulati	Episode: "Convoy"
2007	Not Going Out	Rosie, the lap dancer	Episode: "The Librarian"
2007	Strutter	Mrs. Strutter / various characters	7 episodes (series 2)
2008	Love Soup	Elaine	Episode: "Lobotomy Bay"
2008	Touch Me, I'm Karen Taylor	Various characters	2 episodes: #2.1 and #2.6
2008	Brainiac: Science Abuse	Herself – Co-presenter	10 episodes (series 6)
2009	Skins	Cheryl	Episode: "Freddie"
2009	Hotel Babylon	Luna Cucci	Episode: #4.7
2009	The Kevin Bishop Show	Vocals	2 episodes: #2.5 and #2.6
2009	Comedy Showcase	Lucille	Episode: "The Amazing Dermot"
2010	Coming of Age	Madmoiselle Duquette	Episode: "French Rs"
2010	Law & Order: UK	Marcie	Episode: "Defence"
2010	Frankie Boyle's Tramadol Nights	Various characters	6 episodes
2011	How TV Ruined Your Life	Sitcom Neighbour / Desirable Woman	2 episodes: "The Lifecycle" and "Love"
2012	Diddy Movies	Diddy Sandy	Episode: "Hollywood High"
2012	World Series of Dating	Poppy Weathers	2 episodes: #1.1 and #1.2
2013	Blandings	Paquita	Episode: "Company for Gertrude"
2013	It's Kevin	Various characters	3 episodes: #1.2, #1.3 and #1.4
2013	Shameless	Police Sergeant Randall	5 episodes (series 11)
2013	Starlings	Beautician	Episode: #2.5
2013	Hollyoaks Later	Maria Gonzalez	4 episodes (series 6)
2015	New Tricks	Italian Woman	Episode: "The Russian Cousin"
2016	The Windsors	Ashleigh	Episode: #1.3
2016	Drifters	Waitress	Episode: "The Third Way"
2018	Girlfriends	Natalie	2 episodes: #1.1 and #1.2
2020	4 O'Clock Club	Anna Ford	3 episodes (series 9)
