= Sam Bloom =

British actor and singer

- Born: Samuel Bloom; 19 December 1981 (age 44); Manchester, Greater Manchester, England

Samuel Bloom (born 19 December 1981) is an English actor and singer who was a member of the short-lived pop group allSTARS*.

== Early life ==
Bloom was born in Manchester on 19 December 1981. Graham Gouldman of 10cc was the first husband of Bloom's mother and remained a friend of the family. His uncle was a manager to bands including Herman’s Hermits and 10cc and his brother works in the recording business. He was privately educated at the independent Cheadle Hulme School and at 13 his English teacher got him a small role in the television adaptation of Pride and Prejudice as the young Wickham.

== Work ==
=== Television acting ===
Year	Title	Role	Episode
1995	Pride and Prejudice	Young Wickham	Episode #1.4
2001–2002	STARStreet*	Sam	all episodes
2005	The Last Detective	Young Teddy O'Connor	Episode:Three Steps to Hendon
2006	Kerching!	Tony	Episode:Making a Difference

=== Television appearances ===
Year	Title	Role	Details
2001	80s Mania	Performer (as allSTARS*)	TV documentary
2001	Top of the Pops	Himself (as allSTARS*)	Episode dated 22 June 2001
2002	Top of the Pops	Himself(as allSTARS*)	Episode dated 25 January 2002
2002	Stars in Their Eyes	Himself (as allSTARS*) / Steps (as allSTARS*)	Popstars Special
2006	Boys Will Be Girls	Himself	Episode #1.1

=== Stage acting ===
Year	Title	Role	Venue
2006	The Snow Queen	Kay	Rodean Theatre
2006	The Snow Queen	Kay	Manchester Opera House
2007–2008	Aladdin	Aladdin	Liverpool Everyman

== After the band ==
Bloom is co-founded of 'Inspiring Interns', a recruitment agency for interns and graduates in Central London.
