= Paul Terry (actor) =

English former child actor

- Born: Paul Christopher James Terry; 7 November 1985 (age 40); Watford, Hertfordshire, England
- Occupations: Former child actor, teacher
- Years active: 1994–2000
- Known for: James and the Giant Peach; Microsoap

Paul Christopher James Terry (born 7 November 1985) is an English former child actor. He is best known internationally for starring as James in the 1996 film adaptation of Roald Dahl's James and the Giant Peach. He also starred in the four seasons of the children's sitcom Microsoap (1998–2000).

== Early life ==
Terry was born in and grew up in Watford, Hertfordshire, north of London, and persuaded his parents to let him attend acting classes when he was five years old. He made his stage debut the following year in a regional production of Turgenev's A Month in the Country. In 1994, his father heard about the auditions for James and the Giant Peach, and thought his son would be perfect: "Like James", he said, "Paul can act like a little boy lost."

== Performing career ==
Director Henry Selick chose him, out of hundreds of child actors, to play the title role in James and the Giant Peach. The role required live acting as well as animation voice-work and singing. The live-action sequences were filmed in San Francisco, and the shoot took six weeks. For his role in the film, which included singing one solo song and two ensembles on the soundtrack, Terry was nominated for a Young Artist Award for Best Performance in a Voiceover.

He later starred in 26 episodes of the children's sitcom Microsoap from September 1998 to February 2000. The program aired in the UK, the U.S., and other countries. He gave up acting after the series ended.

In the 2000s he was the bass guitar player for the indie band Glassapple. The group gigged in the London area, toured in the U.S., and in 2005 released a 3-track EP.

== Later career ==
Paul received a master's degree in civil engineering from Cardiff University, and his employment has included BAE Systems. As of 2017, he is a mathematics teacher and aspiring novelist, and lives in County Durham in northeast England.

== Filmography ==
- James and the Giant Peach (1996, as James Henry Trotter)
- Microsoap (1998–2000, 26 episodes, as Joe Parker)
