= National Gilbert & Sullivan Opera Company =

English professional repertory company

National Gilbert & Sullivan Opera Company poster

The National Gilbert & Sullivan Opera Company (formerly the Gilbert & Sullivan Opera Company) is an English professional repertory company that performs Gilbert and Sullivan's Savoy operas. Founded in 1995 to perform at the International Gilbert and Sullivan Festival, the company generally stages three or four productions each summer, giving up to 16 performances in Harrogate, North Yorkshire, and also touring.

The company performs full-scale productions of the Gilbert and Sullivan works, with orchestra, using period settings and costumes. Since 2010, in addition to its performances at the festival, the company has generally performed one or more of its productions in an additional venue either before or after the festival. Since 2014, it has toured some of its productions to multiple British cities in repertory, giving up to 42 performances on tour.

== Background ==
The D'Oyly Carte Opera Company performed Gilbert and Sullivan's Savoy Operas continuously, year-round, for over a century, closing in 1982. Until the Gilbert and Sullivan copyrights expired in 1961, no other professional theatre or opera companies were allowed to present the Savoy Operas in Britain, although professional companies performed the operas in North America, Australia and elsewhere, and numerous amateur Gilbert and Sullivan companies performed around the world. After 1961 other professional groups began to perform the operas in Britain.

In 1994, the International Gilbert and Sullivan Festival was founded by Ian and his son Neil Smith partly to fill the gap left by the closure of D'Oyly Carte, and it has been held every August since then in England (except 2020, due to the COVID-19 pandemic). On most weeknights, the festival features a competition among amateur companies from all over the world. On weekends, however, the festival offers professional performances given by companies such as the Carl Rosa Opera Company, Opera della Luna, the New York Gilbert and Sullivan Players, Charles Court Opera, and the festival's own National Gilbert & Sullivan Opera Company.

== History and description ==
=== Productions at the Gilbert and Sullivan Festival ===
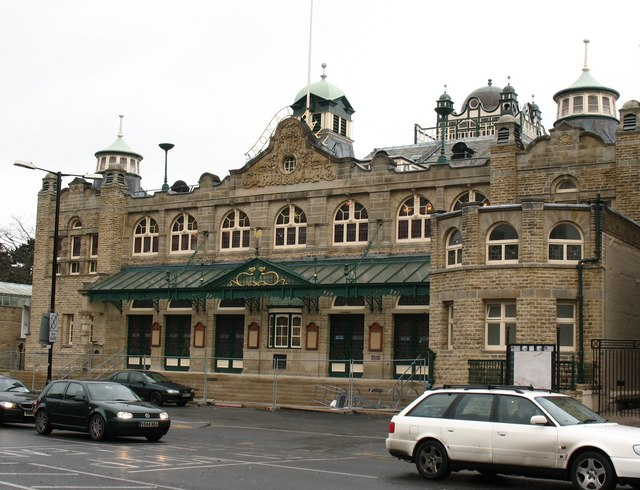
The Royal Hall, Harrogate, the company's main venue since 2014

In 1995, the operators of the International Gilbert and Sullivan Festival formed an opera company to provide festivalgoers with professional productions of the Savoy operas. The company was soon called the Gilbert & Sullivan Opera Company. It engaged such performers as Richard Suart, Simon Butteriss, Bruce Graham, Gillian Knight, Barry Clark, Michael Rayner, Jill Pert, Gareth Jones, Patricia Leonard, Donald Maxwell, Oliver White, Rebecca Bottone, Ian Belsey and the Opera Babes. John Owen Edwards, David Russell Hulme, David Steadman or Andrew Nicklin, among others, have served as music directors for the company. In 2014, the festival registered the company with Companies House as the National Gilbert & Sullivan Opera Company.

The company's performances are accompanied by the festival's National Festival Orchestra. It generally presents four productions each year at the festival, and the festival sells videos of most of its productions. In 2018, in connection with the 25th anniversary of the International G&S Festival, the company presented six productions in Harrogate, Buxton and on tour.

Uniquely among professional companies in Britain, other than D'Oyly Carte, the National Gilbert & Sullivan Opera Company has presented all 13 of the extant Savoy Operas. The company first performed Utopia, Limited in 2011, an opera that has rarely been given a professional staging in Britain over the past century. In 2012 the company mounted the first full-scale professional production of The Grand Duke in Britain since the 19th century, which was one of its four productions that year. Since 2013, the company has given up to 16 performances over the course of the festival at its new home in Harrogate, England. In 2018, the company presented the first professional, fully staged production of Haddon Hall since the 19th century. The company revived Utopia, Limited in 2022, directed by Jeff Clarke and conducted by John Andrews.

=== Performances outside the festival ===
In August and September 2010, the G&S Opera Company presented its first production outside of the festival, The Yeomen of the Guard, at Oxford Castle. Two of its 2012 productions were repeated in Harrogate late in August, and all three of its 2013 productions transferred there in late August. The company toured three of its 2014 productions in repertory from June to August 2014, giving seven performances in each of six cities. Since 2015, besides Harrogate, the company has toured its productions to several cities and towns in the UK, including the Festival's previous home, Buxton. After postponing touring during the COVID-19 pandemic, the company resumed touring in 2022.

== Reception ==
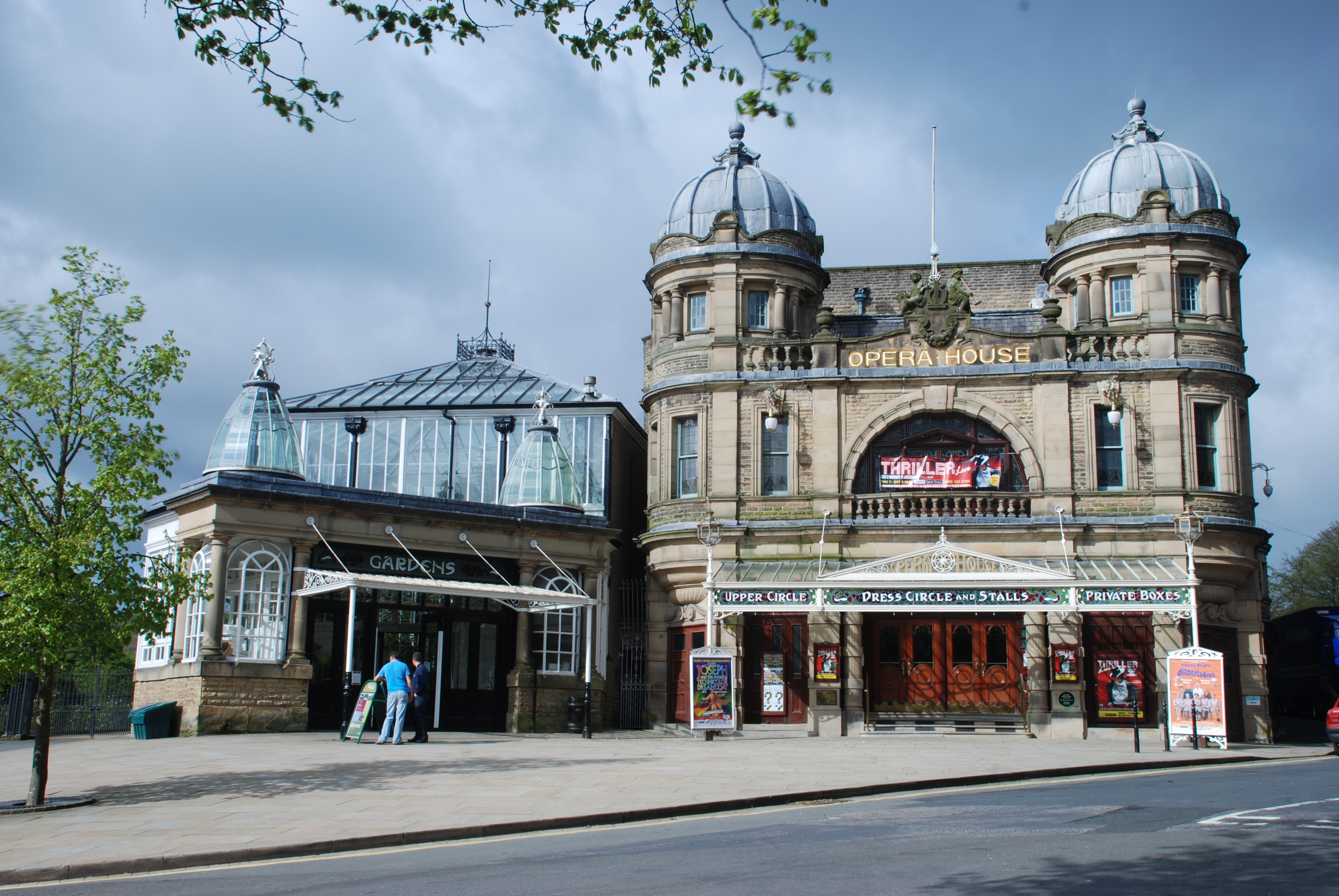
Buxton Opera House, site of the festival from 1994 to 2013, is still used by the company to premiere its annual productions.

Sky Arts called the Gilbert & Sullivan Opera Company's performers "some of the UK's finest exponents of musical theatre". A review of the company's 2010 production of Iolanthe, noted, "The music was up to [the festival's] usual high standard, with the orchestra ... giving a superb and sprightly reading of the Overture and score throughout." Another reviewer of that production commented: With a reputation for strong casts [and] energetic delivery, traditionally fresh interpretations are brought to [the] roles. ... Care is always taken with the staging and lighting of these ... productions and, as with Princess Ida last year, they can match a West End show. ... Throughout, the chorus was outstanding. The Daily Telegraph "thoroughly enjoyed [the company's] spirited production" of Utopia, Limited in 2011. A reviewer said of their 2013 production of Princess Ida, "the performance sparkled; singing, acting, costumes, dramatic flow and orchestral playing were all splendid".

A review of the company's 2014 tour praised the direction, choreography and conducting of The Pirates of Penzance and continued: "They are a real find with strong production values, a great orchestra and first class singing. ... It all looks marvellous with picture book settings and eye catching costumes plus a full and energetic cast. ... The chorus work is top notch, and they all come across as individuals." The Birmingham Mail liked the cast, costumes and "infectious" humour of the company's Iolanthe and called its production of The Mikado "superb", praising the principal cast, chorus and orchestra, but was disappointed in "the decision to make the Mikado ... a fun figure rather than a scary ruler." The company's Iolanthe made a Gilbert and Sullivan fan out of a sceptical reviewer. The Daily Express reviewer said that the company provided "glorious musical entertainment". The Northern Echo reviewed the 2015 tour, stating: "This company is so polished, so well-versed in the eccentricities of Gilbert and Sullivan operettas, with excellent singing voices coupled with clear diction ... and comedic skill. ... [A] tuneful, jolly, laugh-out-loud evening’s entertainment. The Manchester Evening News gave the company four out of five stars, admiring its musical and comic polish, dancing and "magnificent" chorus.

In 2017, a reviewer praised the principals and chorus of the company's Mikado production, commenting: "This is giggle-making, girth-busting comic opera at it's [sic] very best. Sensational singing with sumptuous scenery." A review of their Princess Ida was likewise effusive. The company's 2019 production of The Gondoliers earned a rave review that praised the principal cast and the choral sound, adding:

The choreography ... is energetic and inventive, and the orchestra, too, sounds smart, full and generally on point. ... [C]onductor Timothy Burke set out as he meant to continue, with considerable energy and finesse. ... [With director John] Savournin’s eye for comic detail ... it’s a lively, funny show, with heart and voice both exactly where they should be.

Post-COVID-19 pandemic, the company earned praise for the direction, conducting and performances in its 2022 revival of Utopia, Liimited. A 2024 review commented, "There is a delicious sense of Victorian values in this performance. ... The National Festival Orchestra plays with real finesse and lyricism, with Murray Hipkin’s direction bringing out many an eloquent detail of Sullivan’s scoring. In short, a treat."

== Recordings ==
Recordings of the company's productions are sold by the Festival on DVD and are available on the Festival's streaming service, G&S Opera TV. Some of the productions are also available on CD.
