= International Gilbert and Sullivan Festival =

International festival for Gilbert and Sullivan performance held in England

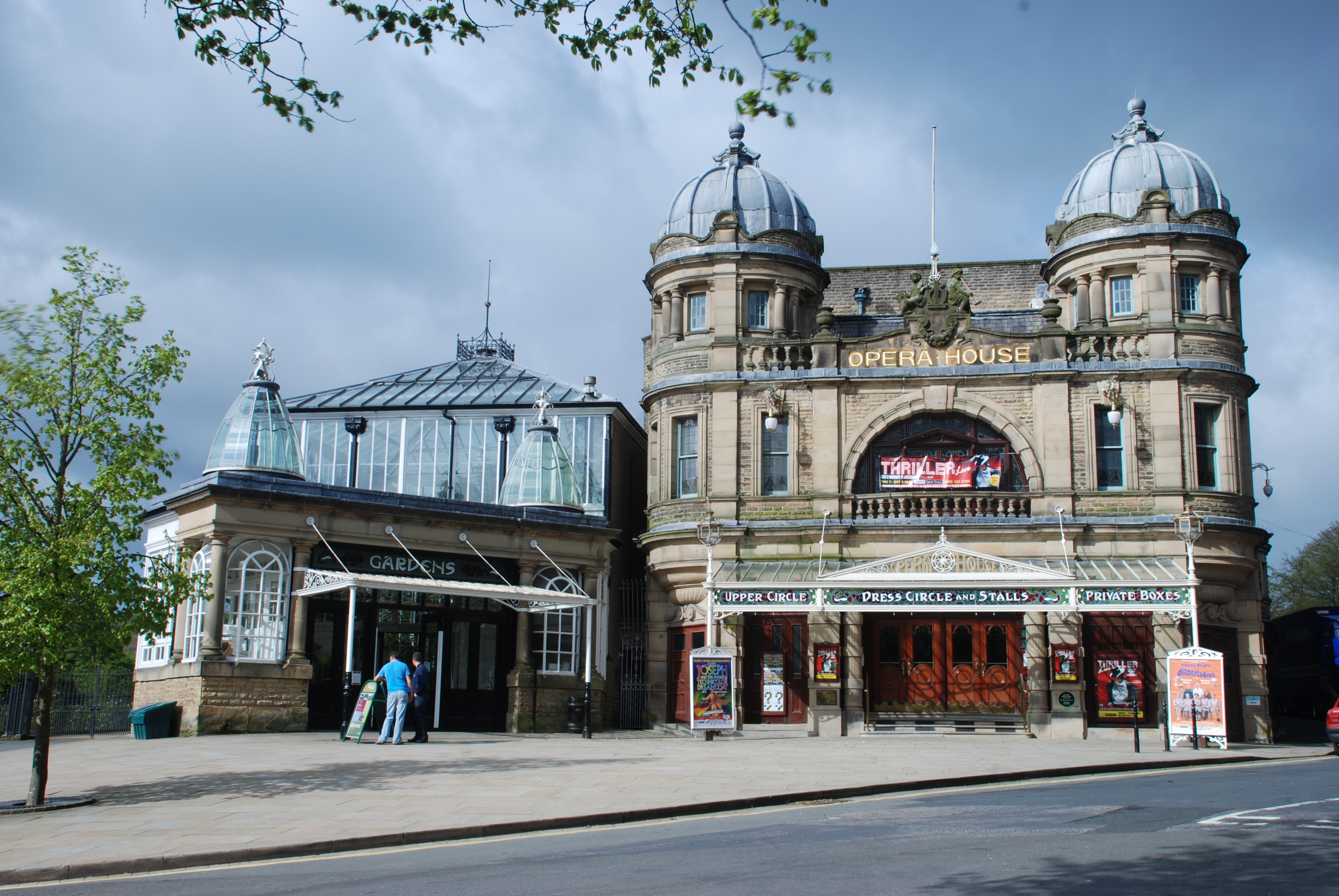
- Buxton Opera House, host of the Festival
- Genre: Savoy opera
- Frequency: Annually
- Venue: Buxton Opera House
- Location: Buxton
- Country: United Kingdom
- Inaugurated: 1994
- Founders: Ian Smith and Neil Smith
- Website: gsfestivals.org

The International Gilbert and Sullivan Festival was founded in 1994 by Ian Smith and his son Neil and is held every summer in England. The two-week Festival of Gilbert and Sullivan opera performances and fringe events attracts thousands of visitors, including performers, supporters, and G&S enthusiasts from around the world. The Festival was held in Buxton, Derbyshire, from 1994 to 2013, and from 2014 to 2022 it was held in Harrogate, North Yorkshire, with a week in Buxton preceding the main part of the Festival. The entire Festival returned to Buxton in 2023, where it continues.

At the Festival, there are both professional and amateur Gilbert and Sullivan performances. Among the professional offerings are performances each year by the Festival's affiliated National Gilbert & Sullivan Opera Company, which also tours. Amateur Gilbert and Sullivan performing societies from around the world perform on the Festival's main stage each year. A smaller nearby theatre and other venues host the Festival fringe, which consists of dozens of performances, including a Unifest competition among university groups, as well as lectures, a memorabilia fair and other events.

== History ==
The Festival was founded in 1994 by English businessman Ian Smith (1939–2019) and his son Neil and continues to be produced by Neil, his widow Janet and their family to preserve and enhance the knowledge and appreciation of the works of Gilbert and Sullivan. It also seeks to reinstate G&S and the performing arts in schools in Britain. The founders believe that the Gilbert and Sullivan works are an important national heritage and legacy, especially as performed in the tradition of the D'Oyly Carte Opera Company, which performed Gilbert and Sullivan's Savoy Operas continuously, year-round, for over a century until 1982. When the D'Oyly Carte Opera Company closed in 1982, greatly diminishing the amount of Gilbert and Sullivan produced in Britain, Ian Smith "had a burning anger" that the English Arts Council had not subsidised the company, and this led him to found the Festival.

The Festival was held in Buxton, England, every year from 1994 to 2013, but it experimented with producing additional Festival weeks in other towns or cities, including Eastbourne, England once; Philadelphia, Pennsylvania twice; Berkeley, California once; and Gettysburg, Pennsylvania twice. The main part of the Festival moved to Harrogate, England, in 2014, where it continued to be held each summer, but it also gave a week of mostly professional shows in Buxton shortly before its fortnight in Harrogate.

The Festival was not held in 2020, when Harrogate was hosting an NHS Nightingale Hospital during the COVID-19 pandemic. During the shutdown, the Festival launched an online streaming service that presents recorded performances from past Festivals and some live content. The Festival received a grant of £120,000 from the government Culture Recovery Fund that helped it to survive the shutdown and, in 2021, resume annually. Until 2022 it continued to run for a week in Buxton and nearly two weeks in Harrogate. In 2023 the entire Festival returned to Buxton, where it continues.

== Description ==
Each summer, beginning with the last weekend in July or first weekend in August, the Festival includes two or three weeks of nightly G&S operas (and weekend matinees) and dozens of daytime fringe activities, The Festival has sold more than 25,000 tickets in some years and has attracted up to 2,000 performers.

Sky Arts described the Festival as "one of the most colourful, melodic and joyous festivals of musical theatre you will come across. Celebrating the timeless, waspishly satirical lyrics of W. S. Gilbert and the brilliant musical inventiveness of Arthur Sullivan, the festival is quite simply the world’s biggest event dedicated to the Savoy operas. ... It is forward-looking and fun presenting contemporary as well as traditional productions of G&S." The Festival's professional orchestra accompanies the main stage performances.

=== The competition ===
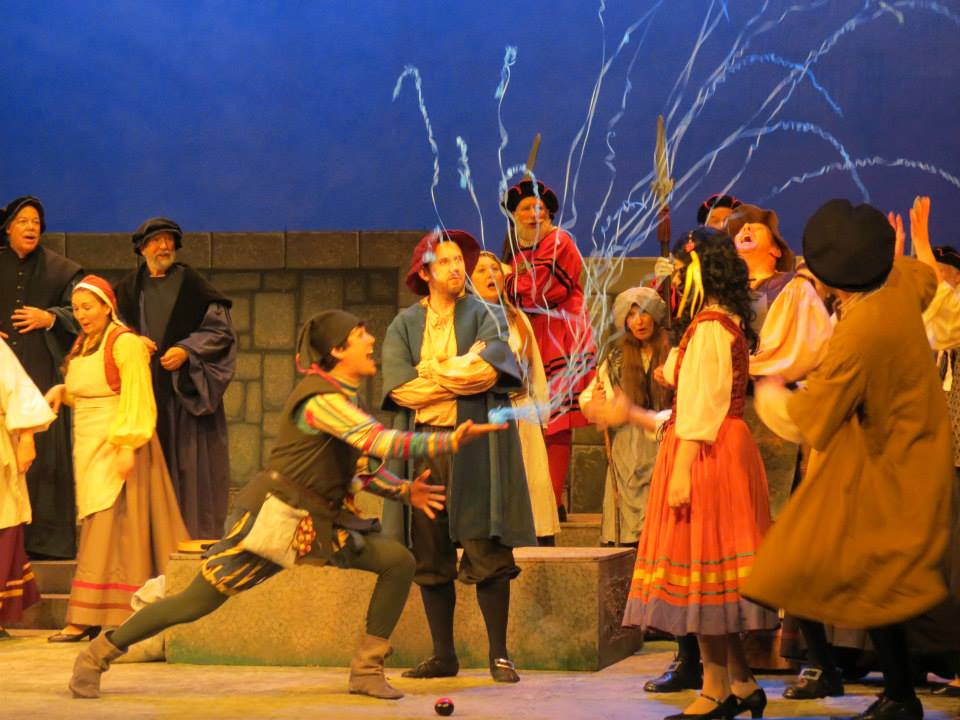
Scene from SavoyNet's Yeomen, the Festival winner in 2013

The Festival began as mostly a competition among amateur G&S performing troupes from Britain and around the world, with up to a dozen or so amateur performances. On the weeknights during each Festival, "the best non-professional groups from the UK and overseas compete for the International Champions title." Some groups perform year after year at the Festival, but some companies, especially those travelling from North America, South Africa, Australia and other distant places, may visit only occasionally or once. Others meet and rehearse entirely at the Festival. The day of performance for each amateur group is hectic, with move-in to the theatre at 9 a.m., lighting call at 11 a.m., the one and only tech-dress rehearsal (with the Festival orchestra) in the afternoon, the performance in the evening, and move-out immediately afterwards.

A professional adjudicator critiqued each amateur performance immediately after the curtain fell. The adjudicator then scored each performance, and both group and individual awards were announced at the end of the Festival. At the first Festival in 1994, first prize was awarded to the production of Utopia, Limited, presented by the Gilbert & Sullivan Society of Maine, in the US (then known as the G&S Society of Hancock County). The Derby Gilbert & Sullivan Company won the first prize more often than any other company (six times); and the South Anglia Savoy Players won five times and placed second four times. Festival Productions, Ireland, won in three consecutive years, 2007 to 2009. Individual awards were also presented for performers, directors and musical directors. The internet group SavoyNet, which has competed each year since 1997, were Festival Champions in 2013 and 2018 and are the first and only company to present all 14 G&S operas at the Festival. By the end of the second decade of the Festival, the number of amateur productions each year had decreased, and after the pandemic the live adjudications were discontinued, but cash prizes are given for Festival and UNIFest champions and runners up.

A "Unifest" competition among university groups is presented each year as part of the Festival fringe, usually in the afternoon matinee slot. The Festival organizers also rehearsed and presented, in earlier decades, an adult "Festival production" as part of the competition and, in some years, a non-competition "Youth Production" (for performers aged 9 to 19). Since 2015, they have instead presented a "Bus Pass Opera" production (for performers over 60) in the competition.

=== Professional productions ===
As the Festival matured, it presented more and more professional performances, first on weekends and now throughout the programme. These are given by companies such as the Carl Rosa Opera Company, Opera della Luna, the New York Gilbert and Sullivan Players, Charles Court Opera, Forbear! Theatre and the Festival's self-produced National Gilbert & Sullivan Opera Company, which has starred such G&S performers as Richard Suart, Simon Butteriss, Bruce Graham, Gillian Knight, Barry Clark, Michael Rayner, Patricia Leonard, Donald Maxwell, Jill Pert, Gareth Jones, Oliver White, Rebecca Bottone, Ian Belsey and the Opera Babes. John Owen Edwards, David Russell Hulme, David Steadman, Andrew Nicklin and John Andrews have served as musical director of the company. Sky Arts calls these performers "some of the UK’s finest exponents of musical theatre". Raymond J. Walker wrote of the National G&S Opera Company:

"With a reputation for strong casts [and] energetic delivery, traditionally fresh interpretations are brought to roles familiar to a large proportion of the [Festival] audiences. With good stars like Jill Pert and Richard Suart in key roles, we were assured of an excellent evening’s entertainment. ... Care is always taken with the staging and lighting of these ... productions and, as with Princess Ida last year, they can match a West End show. ... Throughout, the chorus was outstanding. ... the strength of singing from the twenty-strong chorus in forte passages was spectacular".

Uniquely among professional companies in Britain, other than D'Oyly Carte, the National G&S Opera Company has presented all 13 of the extant Savoy Operas. The Daily Telegraph "thoroughly enjoyed [the company's] spirited production" of Utopia, Limited in 2011, an opera that has rarely been given a professional staging in Britain over the past century. In 2012 the Festival mounted the first full-scale professional production with orchestra of The Grand Duke in Britain since the 19th century. In 2010, the National G&S Opera Company presented its first production outside of the Festival, The Yeomen of the Guard, at Oxford Castle. The company soon began touring its productions in repertory from June to August each summer, giving performances in up to six towns and cities, including Buxton. A review of the opening night of the 2014 tour praised the direction, choreography and conducting of The Pirates of Penzance and said of the company:

They are a real find with strong production values, a great orchestra and first class singing. Musically, this is a very strong show. It all looks marvellous with picture book settings and eye catching costumes plus a full and energetic cast. ... It all works superbly with a company obviously enjoying themselves. The chorus work is top notch, and they all come across as individuals.

The National G&S Opera Company has generally staged four productions at the Festival each summer since 2015, giving up to 16 performances there, while the other professional companies usually give a few performances each. In 2018, in connection with the 25th anniversary of the Festival, the company presented six productions, including the first professional production of Haddon Hall since the 19th century.

=== Venues and fringe events ===
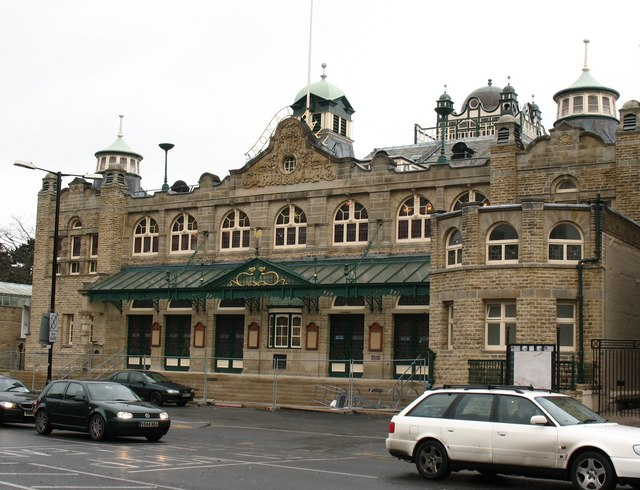
The Royal Hall, Harrogate, hosted most of the main stage performances from 2014 to 2022.

All of the competition and the weekend professional performances have been given on the Festival's main stage. From 1994 to 2013, that was the Frank Matcham-designed 900-seat Buxton Opera House. From 2014 to 2022, the main stage was the 1,100-seat Royal Hall in Harrogate, another Matcham-designed theatre. In 2023 all of the Festival's main stage performances returned to the Buxton Opera House. These performances are nearly always accompanied by the "National Festival Orchestra". A review of a 2010 performance noted, "The music was up to [the Festival's] usual high standard, with the orchestra (leader, Sally Robinson) ... giving a superb and sprightly reading of the Overture and score throughout." A 2024 review thought the orchestra "plays with real finesse and lyricism, with Murray Hipkin’s direction bringing out many an eloquent detail of Sullivan’s scoring". The Festival also hosts dozens of performances and fringe activities in smaller venues. In Buxton, these include the 360-seat Pavilion Arts Centre. In Harrogate, some fringe performances were held in the 500-seat Harrogate Theatre and others at various venues in and around the town.

The "fringe" activities have included performances, master classes and lectures by members of the original D'Oyly Carte Opera Company (such as Valerie Masterson, Thomas Round, Gillian Knight, Kenneth Sandford, John Ayldon and John Reed) and other professionals and scholars, and a late night Festival Club, where cabaret performances are given each evening after the opera, and sometimes a G&S singalong is conducted, with festivalgoers volunteering to sing the principal roles. Some years the fringe has included scholarly symposia. There is also a G&S memorabilia fair, providing a chance for collectors and gift hunters to buy and sell G&S recordings, DVDs, books, scores, figurines and other items of interest. Fringe events also include recitals, concerts, lectures, singalongs, Sunday church services that include Sullivan's liturgical music, and productions of lesser-known works by Gilbert without Sullivan, Sullivan without Gilbert, works that played as companion pieces with the Gilbert and Sullivan operas during their original productions and other Victorian and Edwardian works.

=== Effect and allure of the Festival ===
The Festival serves as a "lightning-rod" of G&S activity worldwide. G&S performers and audiences from one part of the world can see performances by groups from other parts of the world. Performances in the traditional style mix with avant garde ones, and G&S scholars can communicate with a wide audience of enthusiasts.

Buxton is a spa town located in the Peak District about an hour southeast of Manchester. It attracts summer opera festivals because of its lodging, dining and local sightseeing choices, such as castles (for example, Peveril Castle), stately homes (e.g. Chatsworth House, Haddon Hall, Hardwick Hall and Calke Abbey) and limestone caverns, including Poole's Cavern, right at the edge of Buxton. The small size of the town provides an intimate and intense festival experience for visitors and performers. An article in Gilbert & Sullivan News said of the Gilbert and Sullivan Festival: "The amateur performances were of a very high standard.... There is a lovely atmosphere in Buxton of Gilbert and Sullivan thriving, being enjoyed, and drawing everyone together as a family."

The Festival also aims to raise awareness and funds for its organizers' efforts to re-introduce G&S into British schools. The Festival has been featured in several British television shows and in the documentary films Oh Mad Delight and A Source of Innocent Merriment. Sky Arts broadcast its features about the Festival and Gilbert and Sullivan several times in 2010.

== Recordings ==
Recordings on DVD of most of the amateur and professional productions that have been seen at the Festival, as well as for some of the fringe events, are produced by the Festival organizers. The filmed versions are also available on the Festival's streaming service, G&S Opera TV. Some of the Festival's professional shows are also available on CD.

== Companies that have performed at the Festival ==
Professional

- Carl Rosa Opera Company, London
- Charles Court Opera, London
- Forbear! Theatre, London and touring
- Heritage Opera, touring
- National Gilbert & Sullivan Opera Company, Buxton and touring
- The New York Gilbert and Sullivan Players, New York City and touring
- Opera della Luna, touring

Most successful amateur UK award winners

- Derby Gilbert & Sullivan Company (six championships; company closed in 2018)
- South Anglia Savoy Players (five championships)
- Festival Productions (Ireland) (three championships)

Foreign amateur competitors

- Blue Hill Troupe (New York City, US)
- The Brussels Light Opera Company (Brussels, Belgium)
- Cape Town G&S (Cape Town, South Africa)
- Fraser Valley Stage (Abbotsford, British Columbia, Canada)
- The Gilbert and Sullivan Society of Chester County (Pennsylvania, US)
- The Gilbert and Sullivan Society of Houston (Texas, US)
- The Gilbert & Sullivan Society of Maine
- The Gilbert and Sullivan Society of Victoria (Melbourne, Australia)
- Lamplighters Music Theatre of San Francisco
- Savoy Company (Philadelphia, Pennsylvania, US)
- SavoyNet Performing Group (email-based, with performers from around the world)
- Seattle Gilbert & Sullivan Society (Washington, US)
- St. Anne's Music and Drama Society (Toronto, Canada)

== See also ==
- List of opera festivals
