= Opera della Luna =

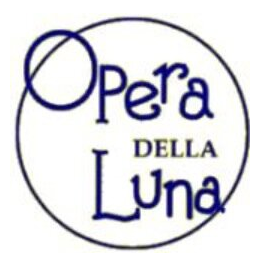
Opera della Luna's logo

Opera della Luna (OdL), founded in 1994, is a British touring theatre troupe of actor-singers focusing on comic works. Led by artistic director Jeff Clarke, it takes its name from Haydn's operatic setting of Goldoni's farce Il mondo della luna. The company presents innovative, usually zany and irreverent, small-scale productions and adaptations of Gilbert and Sullivan, Offenbach and other comic opera and operetta, in English. OdL is a registered British charity.

After directing his own touring opera ensemble in the 1980s, Clarke formed OdL in 1994. He soon began producing touring adaptations of Gilbert and Sullivan operas and well-known operettas, like The Merry Widow, Die Fledermaus and several Offenbach pieces. The company has also presented shows and concerts on the QE2 cruise ship and elsewhere, annual Christmas pantomimes and summer or festival productions. Other pieces have been by Donizetti, Verdi, Strauss, Mozart and Bernstein.

The company has generally undertaken two major tours each year, visiting more than a hundred mid-scale venues throughout the UK in some years. Occasionally the company has toured overseas. Clarke directs all of the productions, which are mostly small-scale adaptations performed without chorus, accompanied by a small orchestral ensemble.

== History and description ==
In 1986, Clarke founded The English Players, a touring opera ensemble. His productions for that company included English-language adaptations of Love in a Village (which toured as far as Denver, Colorado), Boieldieu's The Caliph of Bagdad and Abu Hassan (two one-act operas presented together), Il mondo della luna and Robinson Crusoé. After four years, Clark disbanded The English Players while he planned for a new, better-funded company.

With the help of marketer and versatile theatre professional Graham Watson, Clarke established Opera della Luna (OdL) as a registered charity with a board of directors and a base of regular supporters. The company's name, adapted from the name Il mondo della luna, is intended to convey its zany style of adaptation. OdL's first production, in 1994, was Robinson Crusoé. Plagued by transit strikes, the show lost money. Clarke and friends made up part of the deficit by playing evenings of music hall concerts. The company recovered and has toured successfully ever since. In 2010, Clarke described OdL's first 15 years in a memoir of the company organised around photographs of its productions, Borrowed Light: A retrospective of 15 years on the road with Opera della Luna. The book describes all of the company's productions up to 2010 and includes cast lists. Ten years later, in celebration of Opera della Luna's 25th anniversary, Clarke published a further similar volume, Borrowed Light 2: Another 10 Years on the Road with Opera della Luna.

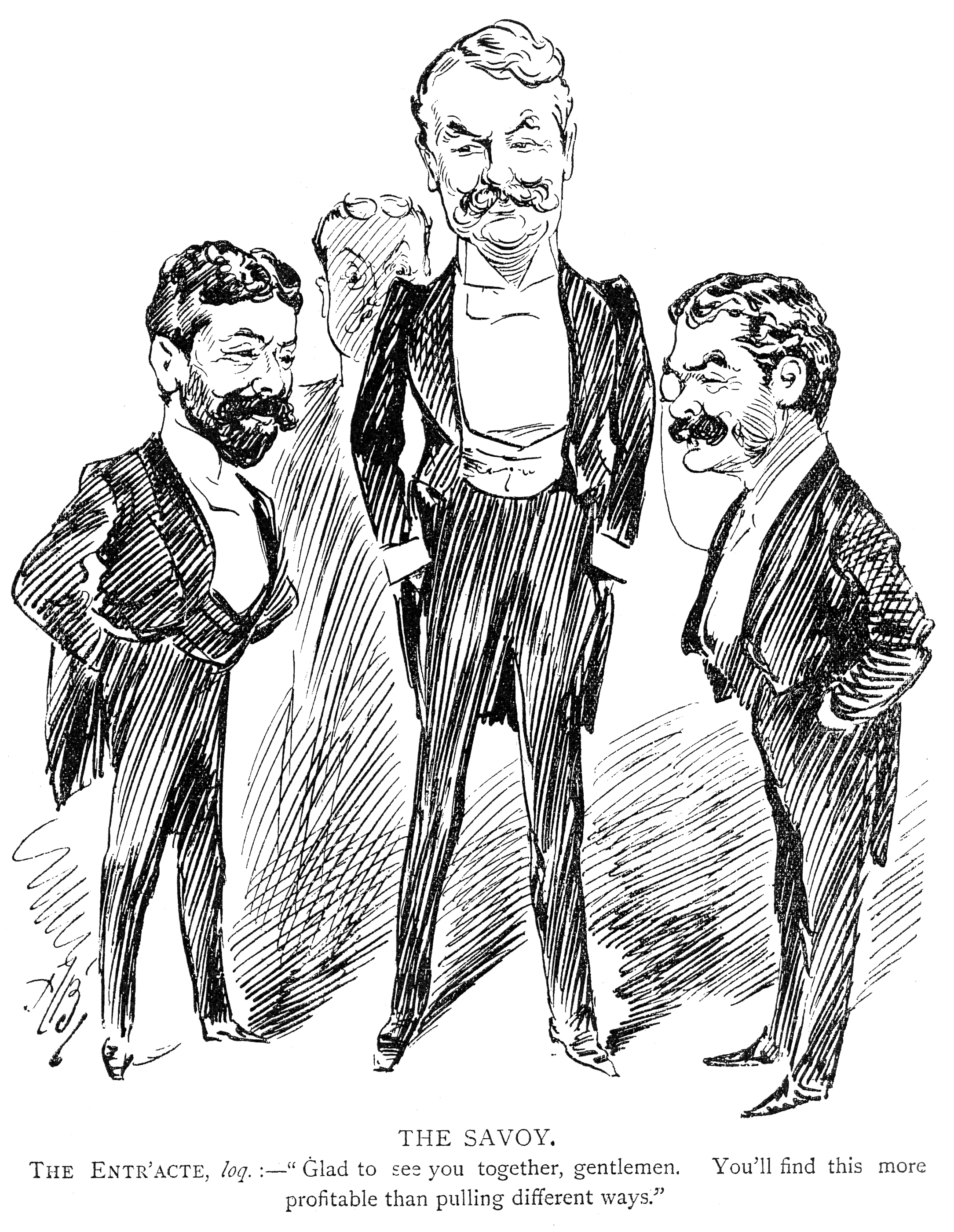
Carte, Gilbert and Sullivan in 1893. OdL reimagined several of their operas a century later.

=== Gilbert and Sullivan adaptations ===
==== Parson's Pirates ====
The company achieved its first theatrical financial success in 1995 with Clarke's adaptation of Gilbert and Sullivan's The Pirates of Penzance called The Parson's Pirates, about the vicar of St Michael's Under Ware, who is tasked with raising church funds through an amateur production of Pirates. The original idea had been merely to produce an evening of Gilbert and Sullivan hits with five singers. Clarke wrote, in his 2010 memoir,

"As I started to try and put a programme together, I thought about making the second half ... a large excerpt from one of the operas. ... Slowly an idea began to develop. ... with one more performer we could possibly do Pirates – it would need ridiculous quick changes and some surprising doublings. ... Richard Gauntlett did a comedy act as a vicar, in which he split the audience into two-halves and got them to join in with 'Tit-Willow', I decided to ... build the first half around him. It would be staged as an audition with some of the cast being planted in the audience. Richard himself would play the Major-General" [in the second half potted Pirates].

Actress Louise Crane played Ruth and is still a member of OdL. Choreographer Jenny Arnold had worked on Robinson Crusoe with the old company and has continued as choreographer ever since. The piece (and all of OdL's subsequent G&S pieces) is played without chorus – principals are assigned to cover choral lines in the music, in sometimes startling and amusing ways. The original three-night stand was a surprise hit, and touring followed. Since then Richard Suart and Ian Belsey have performed in the production numerous times. Critic George Hall wrote that the production "is an evening of brilliance, both a tribute to and an affectionate send-up of [Pirates], done with verve, style, some excellent voices and a hefty quotient of camp. With Richard Suart ... we know we're in for a treat.... Ian Belsey [and the rest of the cast] are all great fun and Jeff Clarke directs the whole at a cracking pace.... This is a show both for Gilbert and Sullivan devotees and for novices.... In short, a total treat – irresistible and unmissable."

==== Ruddigore and Mikado ====
Three other G&S adaptations soon followed, with direction by Clarke and choreography by Arnold, all adapted for a cast of 6 to 8 and no chorus. The first was The Ghosts of Ruddigore (1997), where a couple of nerds, Amanda Goodheart and Kevin Murgatroyd, have car trouble like Brad and Janet in the Rocky Horror Show. They find themselves in the spooky Brigadoon-like village of Rederring, where they discover their ancestors and become embroiled in the tale. One reviewer said that the production supplied "Belly laughs, baronets and more than a touch of Blackadder".

Next was The Mikado (1998). The company's updated adaptation is set in a hip tailor/design shoppe and inspired by the sexy, flashy world of fashion. As Clarke described the genesis of the production, he was in New York City over Christmas 1997 and visited the Metropolitan Museum of Art, which was showing a special exhibition of the work of Gianni Versace. "I was confronted with a dress; a cheeky mini-crinoline, sexy and sassy, classical and witty. The startling originality, colour and fun of it hit me like a blow – imagine three of these – the three little maids! Remembering that Ko-Ko, before his elevation to Lord High Executioner, had been a cheap tailor.... the germ of an idea started. Why not make Ko-Ko a designer? ... a Jean-Paul Gaultier – camp, outrageous, and bursting with creativity and invention. This gave the green light to filling the stage with all sorts of over-the-top theatrical fashion creations". Clarke engaged fashion designer Gabriella Csanyi-Wills to create the costume designs; she originated the idea to make the second act set, Ko-Ko's garden, out of fabric. Clarke decided that Katisha would be based on the older women in Dallas or Dynasty. "Women long past the first flush of youth, but determined not to grow old gracefully. ... [If] she becomes a sympathetic character, the whole plot collapses. But the ridiculous picture of a woman in love with a man half her age is one we are all familiar with ... the key to what makes Katisha pitiful." This production, featuring Simon Butteriss as Ko-Ko and the Opera Babes as Yum-Yum and Pitti-Sing, also became a success, and theatres were eager to book it. One new opportunity for the company was the chance to showcase the production at the 1999 Covent Garden Festival – OdL's first London performances – and at subsequent Covent Garden Festivals. The production continued to be very popular on repeated tours.

==== H.M.S. Pinafore, The Sorcerer and The Gondoliers ====
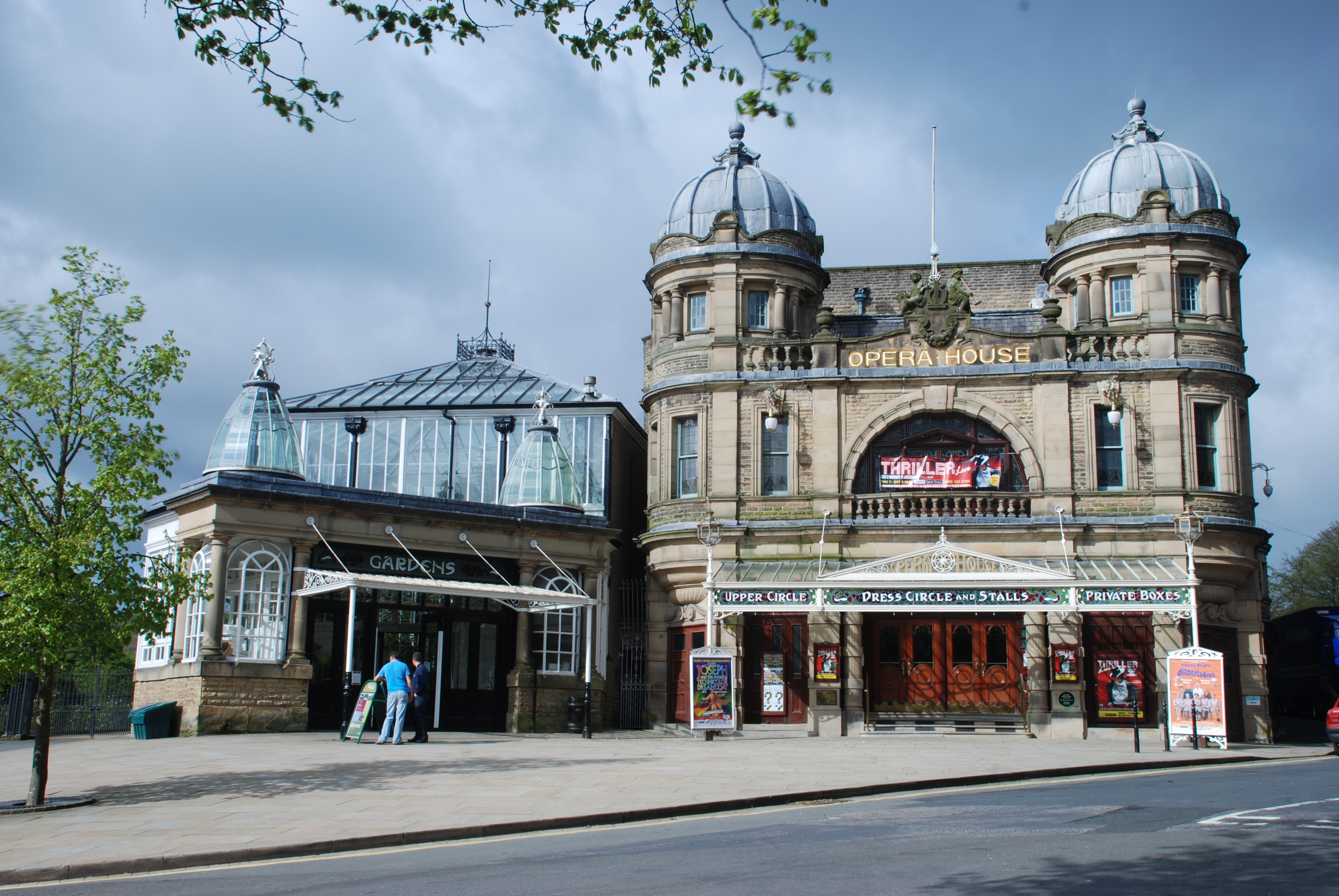
OdL has performed at the Buxton Opera House in both the International G&S Festival and the Buxton Festival.

H.M.S. Pinafore was first presented in 2001 on the QE2 cruise ship and sailed as far as Australia. Clarke's adaptation was designed to meet the ship's one-hour time limit for entertainments. This was repeated in subsequent seasons on the H.M.S. President, a ship moored on the River Thames that doubled as the Festival Club for the Covent Garden Festival (Julia Goss played Little Buttercup), and in 2002 on a different cruise ship with both Pinafore and Mikado. In the energetic opening scene of Pinafore, the company erects the H.M.S. Pinafore right before the audience. Clarke noted, "Many an old sailor, when his sea-faring days were over, worked on the fly floor of a theatre ... used to signal cues to fly the scenery by whistling. That is the origin of the theatrical superstition that it is bad luck to whistle in the dressing room. ... I wanted to find some visual way of showing this connection, so to have the sailors "flying" the scenery by pulling the ropes and tying them off would be a great trick. The company's typically zany version of Pinafore is played in Victorian dress with few textual and musical changes from the original.

OdL has performed all of its Gilbert and Sullivan productions at the International Gilbert and Sullivan Festival nearly every year since 2003 as well as touring them extensively. Another G&S-related piece is The Burglar's Opera, with a script by Stephen Wyatt, based on W. S. Gilbert's 1890 short story, Burglar's Story, mixed with elements of The Threepenny Opera. The music was adapted by Jeff Clarke from Arthur Sullivan's orchestral music. This toured in 2005 and 2006. In 2007, Clarke introduced a new piece called Nightmare Songs in which Simon Butteriss plays an understudy to the principal comedian of a fictionalised D'Oyly Carte Opera Company during World War II and must be ready to go on at very short notice to play in any of ten G&S patter roles. Clarke plays another resident of his lodging house, an itinerant "variety" performer who assists and hinders the patter man's nightmarish rehearsal. The two men have performed the piece many times.

The company's adaptation of The Sorcerer was first produced at the 2009 International Gilbert and Sullivan Festival. The setting of the opera is updated to the 1970s, and the love potion causes Dr. Daly to fall in love with Alexis, rather than Aline. Clips from the Buxton presentation are included in a 2010 Sky Arts TV series about G&S, narrated by Butteriss, called A Motley Pair. OdL toured the production repeatedly over the ensuing years. A review called the show "one of the most delicious musical feasts on the circuit". Another review commented, "Sharp and witty, it oozed fun and inventiveness while satirising the class structure of English village life and marriage. ... The uniformly good cast have fine voices, allied to stagecraft and excellent comic acting skills. They delivered the piece with pace and panache. Clever use of tableaux and excellent sung and spoken diction ... ensured total enjoyment." The company toured this opera extensively in the years following its premiere as part of its regular repertory.

The last Gilbert and Sullivan piece staged by OdL was The Gondoliers in 2014; Clarke added to his usual small principal cast a local chorus, at each tour stop, made up of 24 local singers. Also during this period, Clarke directed, and some members of the company starred in, productions of the National Gilbert & Sullivan Opera Company, including Princess Ida (2009), The Yeomen of the Guard (2010 and 2011), Ruddigore (2011) and The Gondoliers (2012). Clark returned to the National Gilbert & Sullivan Company in 2022 to direct Utopia, Limited.

=== Other repertory ===
==== 1996 to 2009 ====
The company has mounted several Offenbach works

Early on, the year after its first success with The Parson's Pirates, the company produced a Donizetti adaptation, Lucia, The Bride of Lammermoor. As it turned out, the opera would be OdL's only non-comic piece, and Clarke decided that the company was better off making a name for itself through its zany comic productions than competing in the standard repertoire against the other small touring British opera companies.

After introducing its first three Gilbert and Sullivan productions, the company turned to other works, as Clarke feared that it would become identified exclusively as a G&S company. In 1997, when the Royal Opera House had to close for renovations, they presented a season at the Shaftesbury Theatre, including some lighter works, such as The Merry Widow, with a translation by Jeremy Sams. It was not a success, and the Royal Opera agreed to license the translation to OdL after having seen the company's Mikado at the Covent Garden Festival. The company first played the piece at the Covent Garden Festival in 2000 and later toured it extensively, often to larger theatres. OdL's updated chamber adaptation included naughty puppets three years before Avenue Q premiered. Clarke recalled, "Shadow puppets for Valencienne and [Camille] in the pavilion required some restraint from Miss Knight and Mr [Carl] Sanderson, who were only too ready to make their assignation more graphic than Lehár intended. But the "grisettes" [were] life-size puppets – dazzlingly costumed in frills and feathers and prepared to reveal far more than any chorus girls had previously done."

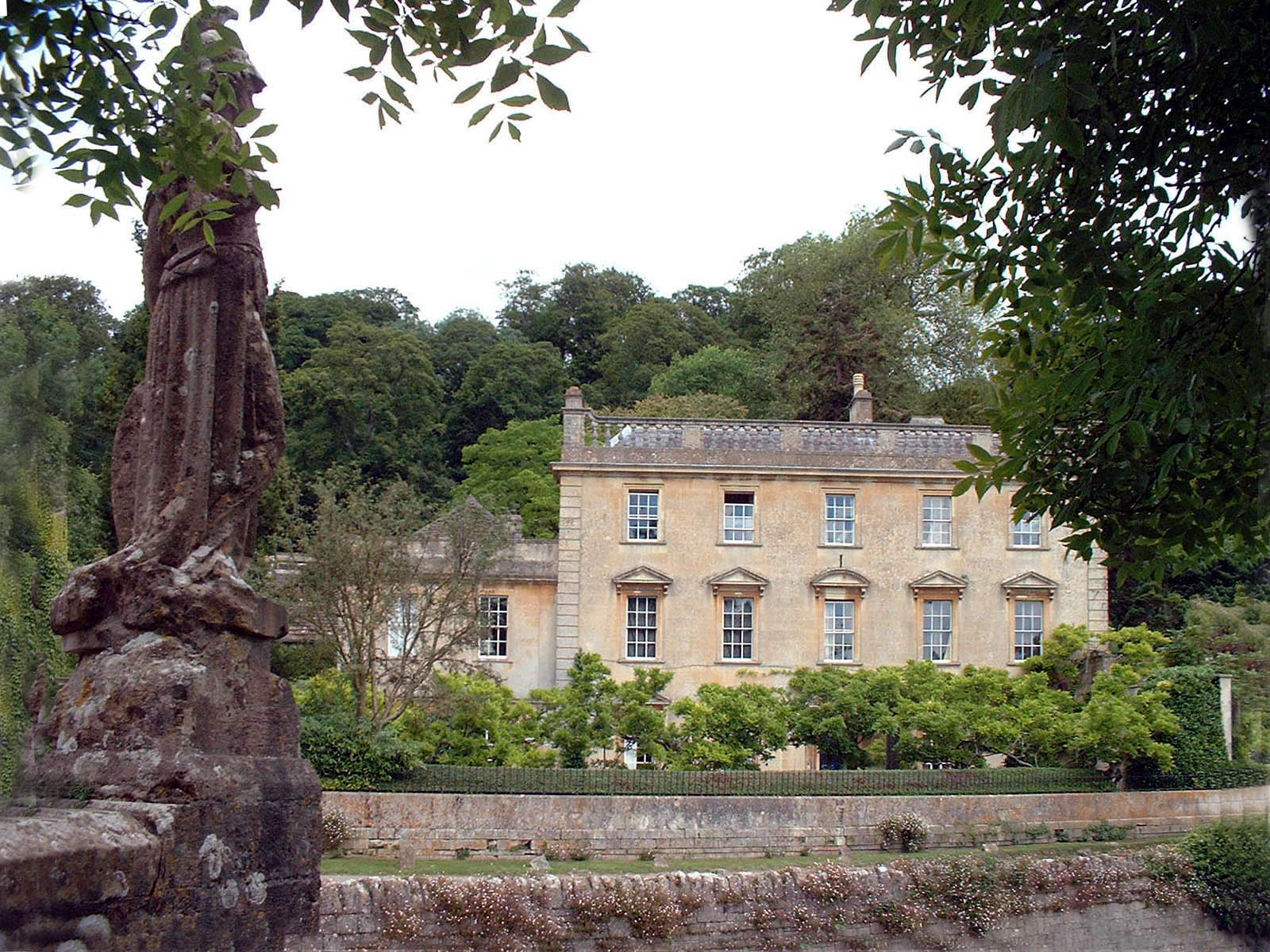
Iford Manor, home of the Iford Arts Festival, a frequent OdL venue

In 2003, the Iford Arts Festival commissioned the company to create a chamber version of Offenbach's La belle Hélène, which OdL later toured. Belsey returned, and Simon Butteriss made his debut with the company; they have both played many seasons for OdL, particularly in the Gilbert and Sullivan productions. Clarke did not tell the festival organizers what he had planned: "The show was rude. It contained not a few four letter words; the cast handed out Viagra to the audience in the last act; and most alarmingly, in the celebrated Act 2 Helen and Paris duet 'Am I but dreaming?'", the mezzo-soprano was topless. The audiences were enthusiastic, and the piece toured. Iford later commissioned productions of Robinson Crusoé (2004), a scaled-down version of The Tales of Hoffmann (2005) and Clarke's Lucia. Clark wrote of these years, "The early part of the year would be work on QE2 ... followed by the company's spring tour. Summer would be taken up with preparations and performances for Iford and [the International G&S Festival at] Buxton. There would be an extensive autumn tour from September to early November, and then the company would perform its annual Christmas pantomime at the Corn Exchange, Newbury." OdL began to present Christmas pantomimes in 1995, including, Dick Whittington and his Cat, Aladdin, Sleeping Beauty, Puss in Boots, Cinderella, Robinson Crusoe and Robin Hood. Clarke felt that these productions enhanced the reputation of the company, and "the chance to create exciting music theatre for children was one we relished."

In 2006, at Iford, the company revived Il mondo della luna. Clarke's English translation hews closely to the original libretto, but some material is cut. The same year, OdL first produced a new English version of Donizetti's L'Elisir d'Amore set at a health spa, which it then toured. That Christmas, the show was a revue called A Little [Christmas] Night Music, with songs from musical theatre, operetta, opera and cabaret. Occasionally, the company presented other similar revues that it called Moonstruck or The Amorous Goldfish. In 2007, it also mounted Stravinsky's The Rake's Progress. At the end of the year OdL staged the first of its holiday-themed Christmas Nuts pastiches, which it continued to stage most Christmases until 2019, in aid of a charity. In 2008, the company toured Verdi's Un giorno di regno ("King for a Day"). In Clarke's broad English adaptation, the story is moved to post-war Italy around the reign of Umberto II, infused with elements of organised crime, and political humour is added. One reviewer commented that the production "makes up for what it lacks in bel canto elegance by being a riotously funny, enormously enjoyable evening's entertainment". In 2009, OdL began touring its version of Strauss's Die Fledermaus in Clarke's English translation. The show was another success for the company, was toured to larger venues, and was featured in Opera Now magazine in May 2009. OdL toured this opera extensively over the following years.

==== 2011 to 2021 ====
OdL's production of Don Giovanni premiered at Ilford in 2011 and later toured to such venues as The Lowry. Nicola Lisle, writing in the Oxford Mail praised its "suitably explosive and menacing treatment of the more sinister elements of the opera, [while grief and love are] handled movingly and sensitively. ... [Its comedy] bristles with energy and purpose, with plenty of laugh-out-loud moments, [in] a witty and daring new translation." The company followed this with a revival of The Merry Widow, which it toured for several years. It was then commissioned to produce three summer productions of French comic opera. Its farcical La Vie parisienne was first seen at Ilford in 2013, with a partly steam punk setting. The second of these was The Daughter of the Regiment in 2014. Clarke puzzled over how to produce this opera in Ilford's small space with a small cast. He remembered that American G.I.'s returning from the Second World War had formed motorcycle gangs with quasi-military hierarchies and often supported disadvantaged children. In his concept, a tough girl is raised by a 1950s "regiment" of California bikers.

The third was Orpheus in the Underworld, a typical madcap OdL production that played at The Lowry and elsewhere after its 2015 premiere at Ilford. Rupert Christiansen commented in The Telegraph: "I can't think of a performance of Orpheus in the Underworld that I've ever enjoyed as much as this rumbustious, unpretentious, and jolly version, executed with tremendous verve". A few years earlier, in Paris, Clarke had been delighted by a double bill of two hilarious one-act Offenbach operettas, Croquefer, ou Le dernier des paladins and The Isle of Tulipatan. Under the title Tales of Offenbach, the company first brought Clarke's translation of the two to Wilton's Music Hall in 2016 and then toured them. OdL next returned to Strauss. The Queen's Lace Handkerchief (1880) had been very popular in Austria, Germany and the US through the turn of the 20th century but is almost unknown in Britain. Clarke reconstructed and adapted the piece largely from American translations. OdL presented this "spirited revival" at Wilton's in 2017.

Ilford asked the company to stage Candide for the 2018 centenary of Leonard Bernstein's birth. Because the work demands a larger production that OdL typically mounts, it joined forces with Ilford Arts and then played the piece at two other venues. One review found the production to be a "whirling, high-energy collaboration [that] packs every possible punch in a furiously creative evening". The same year OdL was invited to appear at the Buxton Festival, where it revived Daughter of the Regiment. This was repeated soon afterwards at Wilton's, where OdL also presented a semi-staged concert of The Arcadians. At the request of the Buxton Festival, the company revived Orpheus in its 25th anniversary year, 2019, which OdL repeated at Wilton's, followed by revivals and tours of Parson's Pirates, Pinafore and La belle Hélène. The company gave only one performance, in January 2020, before theatres closed during the COVID-19 pandemic. For its first show upon reopening in 2021, OdL toured a double bill, titled Curtain Raisers, of Cox and Box by Sullivan and Offenbach's The Two Blind Beggars, with a translation by Clarke.

==== 2022 to present ====
OdL presented the first British production of Three Decembers, composed by Jake Heggie, at Wilton's and then on tour in 2022. It also continued touring H.M.S. Pinafore annually from 2022 to 2024. In 2023 at Wilton's and 2024 on tour, the company presented Sweeney Todd, an 1847 melodrama by George Dibdin Pitt, adapted by Clarke. Richard Morrison wrote in his 4-star review in The Times: "The 1847 melodrama ... was even more popular in its day than Sondheim's [musical] is in ours. After seeing this riotously funny production by Jeff Clarke's Opera della Luna company you understand why. ... [A] rollicking entertainment." The company celebrated its 30th anniversary in 2024 with a run of The Parson's Pirates at Wilton's. OdL revived its touring production of The Mikado in 2025. In 2026, it presented Straus's The Chocolate Soldier with a new English libretto by Clarke, at Wilton's and on tour, the first London revival since 1940. The reviewer for The Stage commented, "Clarke is unique in bringing together innocuous fun with real edginess: his operetta stagings are in a class of their own."

== Critical reception ==
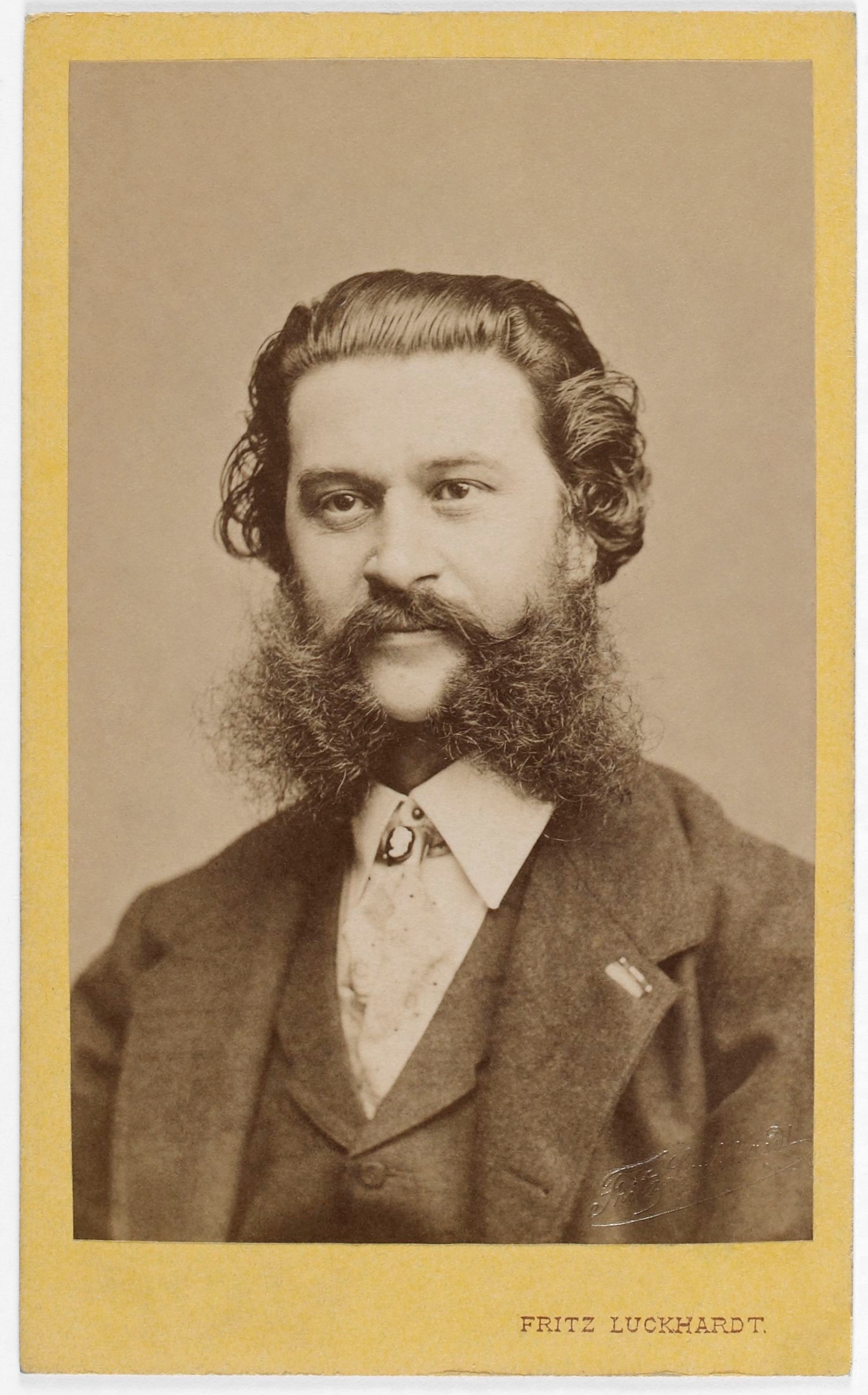
Johann Strauss II, composer of some OdL works

The press generally praises the company for its innovative, irreverent small-scale productions. Musical Opinion wrote, "Who needs grand opera when you can have Opera della Luna? The scale of their performances ... is so small as to be minuscule, but they are so skilfully conceived and realised as to be totally engaging. In their way, they are every bit as rewarding as far more ambitious, not to say pretentious stagings. Director Jeff Clarke can be relied upon to provide a whole new perspective on a piece through his brilliant translations". A review of the company's 2009 adaptation of The Sorcerer in Bucks Free Press stated, "Opera Della Luna is innovative, imaginative and inventive. Its grasp on musical theatre is astounding and director Jeff Clarke should be applauded for bringing a new spirit of the age to G&S." Opera Now magazine wrote, in its review of OdL's 2009 production of Die Fledermaus:

Jeff Clarke's Rocky Horror version of The Bat ... turned out to be rather brilliant, not to mention hilarious.... As is his wont, Clarke, panjandrum of Opera della Luna and its nifty pianist too, had not only translated but rewritten the show so as to be actually funny.... Clarke's hallmark is a cheery vulgarity underpinned with a subtle but distinct moral eye.... But this was all very good-natured.... This non-preachy evening was a success, in the end, mostly because of an inspired cast.... Clarke's little band moved things along at a terrific lick. The most enjoyable evening for ages.

Gilbert and Sullivan expert Ian Bradley comments, "Opera della Luna has achieved the rare feat of bringing in a new audience for G&S without alienating the old one." Typical of reactions to OdL's many appearances at the International Gilbert and Sullivan Festival in Buxton is this Manchester Evening News review of the company's H.M.S. Pinafore in 2006:

[The] festival proper opened with this inventive and entertaining production by M.E.N. Award-winning Opera della Luna. It's a cleverly pared-down version to suit the mere eight-strong company, plus [its five-person orchestra] (and how haunting to hear Dear Little Buttercup as a violin solo by Rachel Davies). Jeff Clarke directs from the keyboard.... The cast is led by the irrepressible Simon Butteriss as Sir Joseph Porter. He gestures, minces and trips around to great comic effect, splendidly aided and abetted by the others... Ian Belsey makes an imposing and funny Captain.... Between them, they entertain hugely."

Rupert Christiansen wrote in 2016 in The Telegraph, "[T]iny, under-funded groups such as Opera della Luna have been making admirable efforts to keep the [operetta] repertory alive. ... [A]dventurous companies such as ... Opera della Luna ... add a sprinkle of glitter to the gaiety of the nation. Reviewing the company's 2017 production of The Queen's Lace Handkerchief, Richard Bratby wrote in The Spectator, "Opera della Luna understands that, and proves – not for the first time – that the rarest pleasures can come with the lightest touch." The same critic wrote in 2021: "Opera della Luna is a little miracle: a shoestring touring company with a near-supernatural ability to get inside the head (and heart) of 19th-century comic opera. In recent years, they've given the UK première of a Johann Strauss operetta, a rare modern staging of the Edwardian West End smash The Arcadians, and an Offenbach double bill that was so raucously, scabrously funny that even writing about it has just made me choke on my tea."

== Other sources ==
- Bradley, Ian (2005). Oh Joy! Oh Rapture!: The Enduring Phenomenon of Gilbert and Sullivan. Oxford University Press. ISBN 0-19-516700-7.
