= John Owen Edwards =

British conductor

John Owen Edwards is a British conductor who has been particularly associated with the lyric theatre, especially West End musicals and light opera. He conducted recordings of many of the works with which he was involved on stage. He also worked as a pianist and arranger.

== Early life and career ==
John Owen Edwards was born in Cartmel, England. He won a scholarship to study composition at Worcester College, Oxford, graduating in 1973, and soon began his career in musical theatre. He conducted for Ruth Welting at the 1975 Royal Variety Performance, and around the same time worked on the musical Billy at the Theatre Royal, Drury Lane. He collaborated with the musician Stephen Oliver several times, accompanying the premiere of A Man of Feeling at the King's Head Islington in 1980, and as pianist in Swansong for Seven Voices by Nigel Dennis on Radio 3 in 1985.

At the Chichester Festival Theatre, he was musical director for The Mitford Girls by Brahms, Sherrin and Greenwell in 1981, for Valmouth by Sandy Wilson in 1982 (later recorded), for the premiere of Goodbye Mr Chips by Starke and Bricusse in 1982, followed by a recording, music supervisor for Ian Judge's production of Sondheim's A Little Night Music in 1989, and musical director for Peter Hall's production of Born Again by Barry, Hall and Carr in 1990.

In 1984 he conducted The Ratepayers' Iolanthe (an updated version of Gilbert and Sullivan' Iolanthe involving contemporary politics) in London, followed by The Metropolitan Mikado, a similar pastiche of Gilbert and Sullivan, in 1985. He conducted the professional British stage premiere of Street Scene in April 1987, a performance in aid of London Lighthouse, where "he guided the large cast ... through this complex score with calm authority". He composed the music for Canary Blunt, a musical with words by David Firth, which premiered at the Latchmere Theatre in 1985 and for which a recording was made by That's Entertainment Records (TER). He conducted the British stage premiere of Kurt Weill's 1936 musical Johnny Johnson for Not the RSC at the Almeida Theatre, London, in August 1986. He conducted operas for the Singers Company including La Périchole, broadcast on BBC2, The Barber of Seville and La bohème.

He conducted the 1989 CD set of Kismet, which included the first recordings of five numbers from the score of Timbuktu!. and the first complete recording of The Student Prince, with David Rendall, Norman Bailey, Diana Montague, Rosemary Ashe, Bonaventura Bottone, and Leon Greene. For the recording of Cabaret with Judi Dench and Fred Ebb, much more of the music was used than often heard; it was billed as covering numbers in the "Original Broadway Score, The Film Score and The Revival Score". In August 1992 he conducted Australian Opera in Melbourne in Les Contes d'Hoffmann.

== D'Oyly Carte and later years ==
He was appointed music director of the D'Oyly Carte Opera Company in 1992, for whom he conducted and recorded The Yeomen of the Guard after a 26-week tour starting from the Alexandra Theatre in Birmingham. This recording featured rarely played horn parts in the Shadbolt aria "When Jealous Torments", Meryll's song "A Laughing Boy", a phrase for Kate in the finale, and the original version of "Is Life a Boon?". One critic noted of the revived D'Oyly Carte Opera Company, "Their greatest single asset is the music director John Owen Edwards: both pieces (Iolanthe and The Count of Luxembourg) were extremely well conducted and their idioms clearly differentiated via an alert orchestra, the Sullivan beautifully clear, allowing one to relish anew the exquisite instrumentation, the Lehar authentically luscious". For the years he was music director of D’Oyly Carte, he conducted Patience, The Yeomen of the Guard, H.M.S. Pinafore, The Mikado, The Pirates of Penzance, Iolanthe, Orpheus in the Underworld, Die Fledermaus, The Count of Luxembourg and La Vie Parisienne. The Mikado was filmed at Buxton Opera House and broadcast on BBC2 on Boxing Day 1992. Owen Edwards was happy with the policy of D'Oyly Carte to branch out into parts of the light opera repertoire beyond its traditional Gilbert and Sullivan, "mentioning in passing such diverse possibilities as ... The Merry Wives of Windsor, German's Tom Jones [and] The Most Happy Fella", the last of which he recorded complete in the late 1990s with Loesser's daughter Emily as Rosabella and included six extracts cut before the opera opened on Broadway.

At the National Theatre in London he conducted Oklahoma! He also conducted Orpheus in the Underworld for British Youth Opera in 2002, and at Opera Holland Park in 2009. His concert work includes a series of Gilbert and Sullivan concerts with the Bournemouth Symphony Orchestra,

He has been the musical director of a number of musicals in London's West End, including Annie, Evita, Chess, Anything Goes, The Phantom of the Opera, The Sloane Ranger Revue, The King and I, and A Little Night Music, and also worked on The Wizard of Oz for the Royal Shakespeare Company. For the Hong Kong Academy for the Performing Arts, he conducted the musicals Guys and Dolls and Damn Yankees, also Showboat at the Opéra du Rhin in Strasbourg, and Hello, Dolly! at the Vienna Volksoper

For the Gärtnerplatztheater in Munich, John Owen Edwards created the new orchestration for the continental premiere of Chitty Chitty Bang Bang. At the Stadttheater Klagenfurt he conducted Sweeney Todd: The Demon Barber of Fleet Street in 2009, My Fair Lady, and Les Misérables. At Opera Holland Park he conducted Die Fledermaus in 2004, Die lustige Witwe in 2006 and Orphée aux enfers (Orpheus in the Underworld) in 2009.

He has also conducted many concerts, including with Alfie Boe and ABBA, and taught as a professor at the Guildhall School of Music and Drama from 1977 to 1985, where he conducted Company and Wonderful Town. In 1990 he returned to the Guildhall School of Music and Drama to conduct "with complete authority" a production of On the Twentieth Century and, in July 1991, Out of this world.

In 2012 he supervised rehearsals for a production of The Grand Duke at the International Gilbert and Sullivan Festival and took a joint curtain call in a wheelchair.

== Radio ==
Owen Edwards's work on BBC radio included programmes with the vocal group Cantabile, music for E. F. Benson's Secret Lives, dramatised and narrated by Aubrey Woods, and the same author's Queen Lucia in 1984, Friday Night Is Music Night in 1999 and 2001, from 1978 three series of the comic show The Jason Explanation with David Jason, a radio presentation of Julian Slade's Trelawny in 1983, the RSC production of The Lorenzaccio Story, A Bullet in the Ballet by Brahms and Simon in 1987, dramatised by Pat Hooker, and Salad Days in 1994, on Radio 2.

== Discography ==
- Annie - 1978 Original London Cast, with Ann-Marie Gwatkin, Sheila Hancock, Judith Paris, Richard Manuel (CBS)
- Oklahoma! - 1980 London Cast, with John Diedrich, Rosamund Shelley (Jay Records)
- The Mitford Girls - 1981 Original London Cast, with Patricia Hodge, Lucy Fenwick, Oz Clarke (Philips)
- Goodbye, Mr. Chips - 1982 Chichester Festival Cast, with John Mills, Simon Butteriss, Paul Hardwick, Nigel Stock, Robert Meadmore (TER)
- Valmouth - 1982 Chichester Festival Cast, with Bertice Reading, Cheryl Kennedy, Femi Taylor, Fenella Fielding, Robert Meadmore, Doris Hare, Simon Butteriss, Mark Wynter, Robert Helpmann, Marcia Ashton (TER)
- The Wizard of Oz - 1988 RSC London Cast, with Trevor Peacock, Gillian Bevan, Paul Greenwood, Simon Green (TER)
- Anything Goes - 1989 London Cast, with Elaine Paige, Howard McGillin, Bernard Cribbins (First Night Records)
- Kismet 1989, with Valerie Masterson, Donald Maxwell, David Rendall (Jay Records)
- The Student Prince - 1989 Studio Cast, with Norman Bailey, Marilyn Hill Smith, Diana Montague, David Rendall (Jay Records)
- A Little Night Music 1990 with Siân Phillips, Bonaventura Bottone, Eric Flynn, Maria Friedman, Susan Hampshire, Janis Kelly, Elisabeth Welch - 1990 (Jay Records)
- Song of Norway - 1990 London Studio Cast, with Valerie Masterson, Donald Maxwell, Diana Montague, David Rendall, Elizabeth Bainbridge, Yit Kin Seow (TER)
- Oliver! 1991 Studio Cast, with Josephine Barstow, Boys of King's College School, Julian Forsyth, Nickolas Grace, Sheila Hancock, Stuart Kale, Richard Van Allan, Richard South, Irfan Ahmad (TER)
- Cabaret - 1993 Studio Cast, with Judi Dench, Fred Ebb, Maria Friedman, Caroline O'Connor, Jonathan Pryce, John Mark Ainsley (Jay Records)
- Kiss Me, Kate 1993, with Thomas Allen, Diana Montague, Graham Bickley, Diane Langton - 1993 (Jay Records)
- Show Boat with principals from the Opera North production Willard White, Janis Kelly and Sally Burgess (Jay Records)
- West Side Story 1993, with Paul Manuel, Caroline O'Connor, Tinuke Olafimihan and Sally Burgess - 1993 (Jay Records)
- The Yeomen of the Guard - 1993 New D'Oyly Carte Opera Company, with Leslie Echo Ross, Janine Roebuck, Jill Pert, David Fieldsend, Fenton Gray, Donald Maxwell (TER)
- The King and I 1994 Studio Cast, with Christopher Lee, Valerie Masterson, Sally Burgess, Jason Howard, Tinuke Olafimihan (Jay Records)
- My Fair Lady with Alec McCowen, Tinuke Olafimihan, Bob Hoskins, Henry Wickham, Michael Denison, Dulcie Gray (TER). Gramophone Music Theatre Award winner in 1997.
- Orpheus in the Underworld - 1994 Studio Cast, with Mary Hegarty, Frances McCafferty, Jill Pert, Siân Wyn Gibson, David Fieldsend, Barry Patterson, Richard Suart, Gareth Jones (Sony Classics)
- Patience - 1994 New D'Oyly Carte Opera Company, Mary Hegarty, Frances McCafferty, Jill Pert, David Fieldsend, Simon Butteriss, Gareth Jones (plus the original Act 2 finale, The Duke's song and four Sullivan overtures) (TER)
- Salad Days - 1994 Studio Cast 40th anniversary BBC Radio 2 recording Janie Dee, Simon Green, Lynda Baron, Willie Rushton, Tony Slattery, Samuel West (EMI Classics)
- Annie Get Your Gun - 1995 London Studio Cast, Barry Bostwick, Judy Kaye (TER)
- Anything Goes - 1995 Studio Cast, with Louise Gold, Gregg Edelman (Jay)
- Calamity Jane - 1995 Studio Cast, with Debbie Shapiro, Jason Howard, Alisa Ainsley, Graham Bickley, Susannah Fellows, Tim Flavin (Jay Records)
- Die Fledermaus - 1995 D'Oyly Carte Opera Company, with Rosemarie Arthars, Ade Grummet, Deborah Hawksley, Lynton Black, David Fieldsend (Sony Classics)
- Guys and Dolls 1995 London Studio Cast, with Emily Loesser, Gregg Edelman, Kim Criswell, Tim Flavin, Don Stephenson - (Jay) Billed as first complete recording.
- On the Town - 1995 Studio Cast, with Kim Cresswell, Judy Kaye, Gregg Edelman, Tim Flavin, Ethan Freeman, Valerie Masterson, Tinuke Olafimihan (Jay Records)
- The Dancing Years - 1996 London Studio Cast, with Valerie Masterson, Mary Hegarty, Louise Winter, Lynton Black, David Fieldsend (Jay Records)
- Fiddler on the Roof - 1996 Studio Cast with Len Cariou, Sara Kestelman, Adam Garcia, Deborah Myers (Jay Records)
- The Pajama Game - 1996 London Studio Cast, with Judy Kaye, Ron Raines, Kim Cresswell, Avery Saltzman (TER)
- South Pacific 1996 London Studio Cast Paige O'Hara, Justino Díaz, Pat Suzuki, Sean McDermott (Jay Records)
- Wonderful Town - 1996 Studio Cast with Rebecca Luker, Karen Mason, Ron Raines (Jay Records)
- 110 in the Shade - 1997 Studio Cast, with Ron Raines, Karen Ziemba, Richard Muenz (TER)
- Anyone Can Whistle - recorded 1997 with Maria Friedman, Julia McKenzie, John Barrowman (Jay Records) Billed as first complete recording.
- Oklahoma! - 1998 National Theatre, London with Josefina Gabrielle, Maureen Lipman, Hugh Jackman, Shuler Hensley, Jimmy Johnston (First Night)
- H.M.S. Pinafore - 1999 D'Oyly Carte Opera, with Yvonne Barclay, Alfred Boe, Francis McCafferty, Tom McVeigh, Gordon Sandison, James Cleverton (TER)
- The Most Happy Fella - 1999 Studio Cast, with Louis Quilico, Emily Loesser, Richard Muenz, Nancy Shade, Don Stephenson, Karen Ziemba (Jay Records)
- The King and I - 2000 London Cast, with Elaine Paige, Jason Scott Lee (Warner)
- One Touch of Venus - 2000/2012 Studio Cast, with Melissa Errico, Brent Barrett, Victoria Clark, Judy Kaye, Ron Raines (Jay Records)
- a CD of French operatic airs sung by soprano Valerie Masterson (TER)
- Broadway and West End show songs with Valerie Masterson and Thomas Allen. (TER)
- Is It Really Me? - 1991 Marilyn Hill Smith; songs from musicals (TER)
