= Richard Suart =

British opera singer and actor

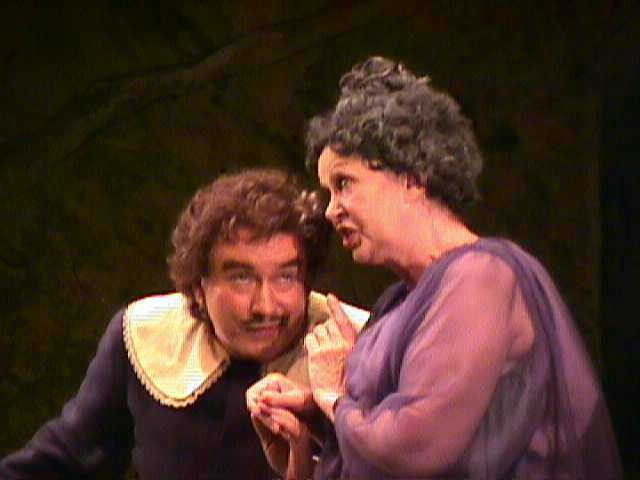
Suart as Bunthorne in Patience alongside Gillian Knight as Lady Jane

Richard Suart (born 5 September 1951) is an English opera singer and actor, who has specialised in the comic roles of Gilbert and Sullivan operas and in operetta, as well as in avant-garde modern operas. He is probably best known for his numerous portrayals of Ko-Ko in The Mikado.

Suart has often performed with English National Opera, as well as other opera companies throughout the UK, Europe and North America. He has also recorded extensively and performed on the concert platform.

== Biography ==
Suart was born in Blackpool, Lancashire. He was educated at Sedbergh School (1965–69) and later studied at St John's College, Cambridge (1971–74) and the Royal Academy of Music (1974–77).

He is chiefly known as a stage performer, but his concert work has included baritone leads in Benjamin Britten's Saint Nicolas, and Monteverdi's Vespers, and a song recital of works by Ravel, Ibert and Mussorgsky at the Wigmore Hall in 1979 as well as some concert performances of his operatic roles.

He appeared at his alma mater, the Royal Academy of Music, in a 1977 production of Menotti's The Consul, supervised by the composer, as John Sorel, alongside Lesley Garrett as the Secretary, conducted by Marcus Dods. In 2004 Suart was elected a Fellow of the Royal Academy of Music.

Suart is married to director and librettist Emma Jenkins.

== Opera ==
Suart's early operatic roles were with the English Music Theatre Company and the Opera Factory, where he sang the Doctor in Birtwistle's Punch and Judy, and Satan, the Puppetmaster and Gaffer Pietro in Osborne's Hell's Angels. He appeared as Horimiya in the world premiere of Minoru Miki's An Actor's Revenge (based on the film of that name) by the English Music Theatre at the Old Vic in London in 1979. The Guardian found his Don Alfonso in Così fan tutte in 1980 "memorably characterised". When he sang Leone in Handel's Tamerlano at the Bloomsbury Theatre with Orpheus Opera in 1982, he was judged "one of the evening’s star turns, and his sardonic asides leavened proceedings wonderfully". That year he also appeared in La vera costanza at St John's, Smith Square, in the first UK performance of the critical edition by Haydn scholar H. C. Robbins Landon. Since then, Suart has divided his stage appearances among operas in the regular repertoire, avant-garde modern operas, and the "patter" roles in Gilbert and Sullivan operas.

His mainstream roles have included, for English National Opera (ENO), small roles in Orfeo, War and Peace, Tosca and Don Carlos in the early 1980s, and Baron Zeta in The Merry Widow (most recently in 2008), Colonel Frank in Die Fledermaus and Benoit and Alcindoro in La bohème; and for Diva Opera, where he directed as well as performing in Britain‚ the Channel Islands‚ Switzerland and France, he sang Dr. Bartolo in The Barber of Seville, the title role in Gianni Schicchi, Dulcamara in The Elixir of Love, and Frank. At the Royal Albert Hall, he sang the Sacristan in Tosca; at Garsington he played Antonio in The Marriage of Figaro (2000) and Caspar in Genoveva, among others; for Reisopera he sang Swallow in Peter Grimes. For Opera North he played Schaunard in La bohème, Don Magnifico in La Cenerentola, the French Ambassador in Of Thee I Sing (1998 and 2008), Barabashkin in Paradise Moscow (2009), and General Adam Snookfield in Let 'Em Eat Cake (2009). For Holland Park Opera he played two roles in Umberto Giordano's Andrea Chénier in 2005 and the Mayor in Jenůfa in 2007.

In Mussorgsky's rarely staged opera The Marriage (1981), The Guardian noted, "It helped enormously that the central role of Podkolyosin was taken by a singer as skilled in comedy as Richard Suart, making him enough of a Wooster-like silly ass to be consistently funny without losing the essential Russian flavour." Suart's Viceroy in La Périchole (1981) was judged "a drolly Dickensian impersonation" by The Times. Rare excursions into early opera have been in Handel's Tamerlano in 1982 and Agrippina in 2007.

Suart played several roles in the 2009 revival of Salad Days by Tête à Tête at the Riverside Studios, Hammersmith. In June 2010 he sang Don Magnifico in La Cenerentola at the Iford Festival Opera at Iford Manor, with and Don Jerome in the Linley family's opera The Duenna by English Touring Opera at the Linbury Studio Theatre, Covent Garden that October. Another Rossini role, Bartolo in The Barber of Seville came with Charles Court Opera at Iford in 2017, where he "used decades of G&S experience to supply a comedic tour de force". He appeared at the 78th Maggio Musicale in 2015 as Pangloss in Candide at the Opera di Firenze. At the Villa Ephrussi de Rothschild for the 20th Les Azuriales festival he joined the finalists of the 15th International Singing Competition in Gianni Schicchi "as a comically spiv-like Schicchi".

For the 2018 revival of Jonathan Miller's production of La Boheme for ENO at the London Coliseum a reviewer wrote "Praise is also due to a singer who was not on stage: Richard Suart, who acted as diction coach".

In 2023, he appeared as Spinelloccio in Gianni Schicchi for Scottish Opera in Glasgow, and as Old Adam in Ruddigore at Opera Holland Park.

=== Modern works ===
For Opera North, Suart originated the role of Stan Stock in Benedict Mason's Playing Away, and for Music Theatre Wales, he created the role of King Arthur in Lynne Plowman's Gwyneth and the Green Knight. With Netherlands Opera, in Amsterdam and Munich, he sang in the world premieres of Param Vir's Snatched by the Gods and Broken Strings. The Guardian called his contribution to the latter "a towering piece of vocal acting". Suart sang in the UK premieres of Shostakovich's Moscow, Cheryomushki for Pimlico Opera (1995), and in the premieres of Mason's Chaplinoperas in New York (2005), Germany, Portugal, Holland and Austria. He has sung Peter Maxwell Davies's Eight Songs for a Mad King in Gelsenkirchen's Musiktheater im Revier‚ Milan‚ Helsinki‚ Strasbourg‚ Stavanger and Paris. In 1987, The Musical Times described his performance in that work as "compelling from start to finish". In 2010, Suart received warm notices for his performance as Pangloss in Candide at the Hollywood Bowl.

In 1999, Suart made his Salzburg Festival debut in Ligeti's Le Grand Macabre. Other modern works in which Suart has appeared include Tippett's King Priam, Betty Roe's Gaslight, Harrison Birtwistle's Yan Tan Tethera and the premiere of The Mask of Orpheus and Aribert Reimann's The Ghost Sonata, in which, The Musical Times wrote, "Richard Suart's Hummel was a remarkable tour de force", Alun Hoddinott's What the Old Man Does is Always Right and Philip Glass's Fall of the House of Usher, in which Suart was praised for his "fine central performance". In 2006, Suart created the role of Mr Walter in Michel van der Aa's After Life at the Holland Festival, and in 2009–2010, he sang the role in Europe and at the UK premiere at Barbican Hall. As the psychopath in Stewart Copeland's The Tell-Tale Heart based on Poe, "Suart was perfectly cast as the disturbed but charming Edgar".

=== Gilbert and Sullivan ===
Suart's association with the Savoy operas began early. At the Royal Academy of Music he took part in the opening performance at the Academy's new opera theatre in 1977, playing the Learned Judge in Trial by Jury. Later in his career he played in the first performance of a Gilbert and Sullivan opera at the Royal Opera House, Covent Garden, as Jack Point in The Yeomen of the Guard when Welsh National Opera included the work in their London season there in 1995. He played several roles in the Savoy operas with the revived D'Oyly Carte Opera Company beginning in 1988, and also in their Orpheus in the Underworld (1994) and La Vie parisienne (1995) by Jacques Offenbach. Of his 1998 performances in The Pirates of Penzance for D'Oyly Carte, The Guardian wrote, "Richard Suart, a natural successor to the great John Reed, patters astoundingly and is gleefully funny as Major-General Stanley."

Suart has played Ko-Ko in The Mikado in revivals of Jonathan Miller's ENO production since 1989 and for many other companies, including twice with the New York City Opera (2001 and 2003). He is known for frequently rewriting the "little list" song from that opera. He published a book in 2008 excerpting many of his "little list" versions and discussing The Mikado, called They'd None of 'em Be Missed. A second volume, Mikado Memories, with lists of all the casts between 1986 and 2016 and reminiscences from many singers, was published in 2020. Also for ENO, he played Major-General Stanley in Pirates in 2004.

With Diva Opera, his Gilbert and Sullivan roles have included the Learned Judge in Trial by Jury and Cox in Cox and Box. In 1995, he played the Lord Chancellor in Iolanthe at the Royal Festival Hall in a concert performance conducted by Roger Norrington. For Opera della Luna, he has performed the role of the Vicar in The Parson's Pirates (2002 and 2008), and he has also performed roles with The Gilbert and Sullivan Opera Company at the International Gilbert and Sullivan Festival, including King Gama in Princess Ida and the Duke of Plaza-Toro in The Gondoliers. He created an entertainment entitled As a Matter of Patter, consisting mostly of Gilbert and Sullivan songs and dialogue and his own anecdotes‚ which he has performed with his wife in the United Kingdom‚ South Africa and the Middle East. Suart has also appeared in three semi-staged productions at The Proms, in The Gondoliers (1997), Iolanthe (2000) and H.M.S. Pinafore (2005); all three performances were broadcast live on BBC Radio 3 and the former two were recorded for later broadcast, in abridged form, on BBC television. In 2012, he appeared as Grand Duke Rudolph in Gilbert and Sullivan's last opera, The Grand Duke.

He played the title role in the first professional staging of Gilbert and Sullivan's Thespis, or The Gods Grown Old since the 1871 premiere, in a performing edition by Anthony Baker and Timothy Henty. In a staging of Haddon Hall by the National Gilbert & Sullivan Opera Company at the Royal Hall, Harrogate, he played Rupert Vernon.

== Recordings ==
Among Suart's numerous recordings are Giovanni Battista Pergolesi's Miserere No. 2 in C minor (1980); Eight Songs for a Mad King (1987 for Finnish TV and Channel 4); Leonard Bernstein's Candide as Junkman, Inquisitor, and King Hermann Augustus, with the composer conducting the London Symphony Orchestra (1989); Dad in Mark-Anthony Turnage's Greek (DVD) filmed in 1990; the Black Minister in György Ligeti's Le Grand Macabre (1992); Blunt in Heinrich Marschner's Der Vampyr (1992); Poet, Hymen in Henry Purcell's The Fairy-Queen (1992); Starveling in Benjamin Britten's A Midsummer Night's Dream (1993); Barabashkin in Cheryomushki (1995); Bardolph in Gustav Holst's At the Boar's Head (1996); and Gob in Ralph Vaughan Williams's The Poisoned Kiss (2003). For the D'Oyly Carte Opera Company, he recorded the Duke of Plaza-Toro in The Gondoliers, the Lord Chancellor in Iolanthe, and Jupiter in Offenbach's Orpheus in the Underworld (1994). For Welsh National Opera and Sir Charles Mackerras, he recorded Ko-Ko in The Mikado (1992), the Major-General in Pirates (1993), Sir Joseph in Pinafore (1994), Jack Point in Yeomen (1995), and the Judge in Trial (1995).

For Hyperion, Suart has recorded the roles of Grigg in Sullivan's The Contrabandista (2004), and roles in the Edwardian musical comedies The Geisha and The Maid of the Mountains (2000). In 2008, Hyperion released a recording entitled Lionel Monckton (1861–1924): Songs from the Shows, featuring Suart and Catherine Bott. In 2004, with the Scottish Chamber Orchestra and Sir Charles Mackerras, Suart recorded the Flanders and Swann number "Ill Wind" as a filler for a CD of the Mozart horn concertos, on one of which it is based. He sang Hassan in the BBC recording of Sullivan's The Rose of Persia (2005). He also participated in the BBC broadcast and recording of Rachel Portman's new opera, The Little Prince (2005) as the Businessman. He is heard on the 2009 recording of Tom Jones as Benjamin Partridge.
