= Iford Arts Festival =

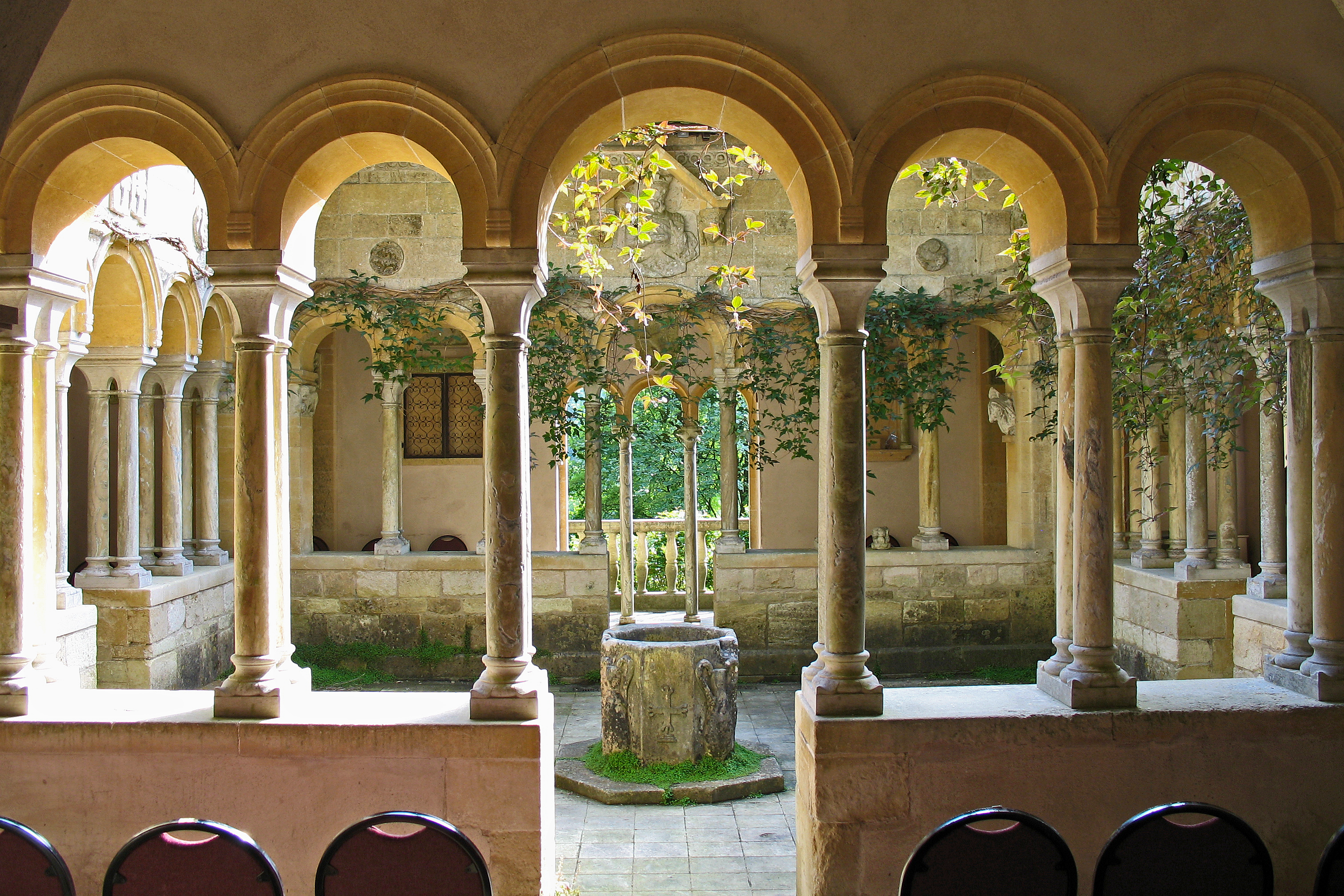
The Cloisters at Iford Manor; in the centre is a well-head from Aquilegia, Italy

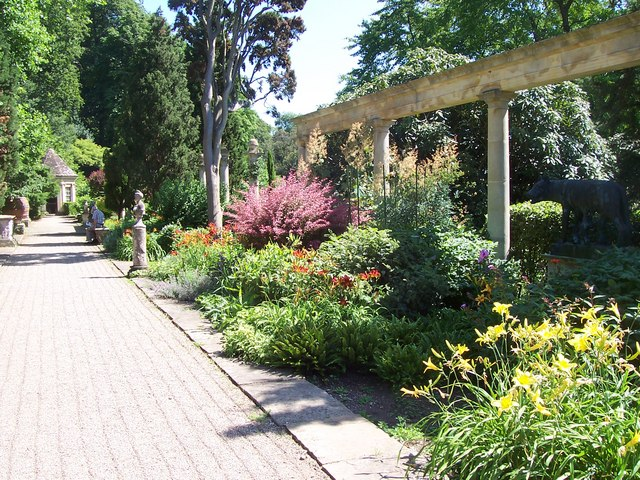
The Great Terrace at Iford Manor

Iford Arts Festival is an annual summer festival of opera and jazz, held at venues in and near Bradford-on-Avon in Wiltshire, England. Operas are produced by Iford Festival Opera. It also features the Iford Jazz Proms, as well as other concerts and performances.

Beginning in 1981, the festival was held in the gardens of Iford Manor, a house dating from the 15th or 16th centuries, about 2 miles southwest of Bradford-on-Avon. With repairs needed to the cloisters at the gardens, and the festival having outgrown the relatively small venue, in 2019 the festival moved to the grounds of Belcombe Court on the western edge of Bradford-on-Avon. The festival is run by Iford Arts Limited, a registered charity set up in 2002.

Opera productions are small-scale, the cloisters at Iford Manor having a seating capacity of 90. At Belcombe Court, operas take place in a specially commissioned geodesic dome for an audience of 240. The 2019 season opened with two nights at the banqueting room of Bath's Guildhall.

The festival's founder was Judy Eglington, the artistic director of Iford Arts. Annual concerts in the cloisters started in the 1980s; the first opera was given in 1993, and the first fully staged opera in 1995. Touring opera companies which have been particularly associated with the festival include Opera della Luna, Opera Project, and Early Opera Company.

== See also ==
- Country house opera
- List of opera festivals
