= Opera Babes =

English crossover duo

- Genres: Classical-crossover, pop, operatic pop
- Occupation: singers
- Years active: 2001–present
- Labels: Sony Music, Dharma Records, Warner Classics
- Members: Rebecca Knight & Karen England
- Website: OperaBabes.com, KarenEnglandMusic.com

The Opera Babes are an English crossover classical music duo, consisting of Karen England, mezzo-soprano, and Rebecca Knight, soprano.

The duo came to wide attention when they sang "Un bel dì vedremo" (from the opera Madame Butterfly) on television sports programmes, beginning in 2002. In addition to performing with major orchestras in Britain and touring with their own shows, they released their first album, Beyond Imagination in 2002 and their second album, Renaissance, in 2006.

== Background and history ==
The Opera Babes met in Cambridge while performing Mozart's The Magic Flute in a touring opera company. England studied at Leeds University and London's Guildhall School of Music and Drama. Knight, whose mother is the opera singer Gillian Knight, wrote for children's television early in her career. Both women have performed with the English touring company Opera della Luna and at the International Gilbert and Sullivan Festival. They began busking together in 2001 on London's Covent Garden, where they were first spotted and were signed for their first album by Sony. They became famous for singing "Un bel dì vedremo" ("One fine day we shall see" from the opera Madame Butterfly), the song that ITV used for their World Cup 2002 programmes, at the FA Cup final and at the UEFA Champions League final in Milan. Knight explained the group's strategy to BBC News as follows: "[W]e have tried to maintain the classical integrity while making these things more appealing to a wider audience."

The Opera Babes released their first album, Beyond Imagination in 2002 (ranking No. 1 on the UK Classical Chart for eleven weeks, and No. 4 on the US Billboard Classical Crossover Albums chart. "One Fine Day" track was selected as the World Cup 2002 theme by ITV. One reviewer wrote: "If you're a young individual with a remote interest in the classical genre, this disc is the perfect introduction". The album has sold over 1.7 million copies. The artists soon had a falling out with their producer, SonyBMG, which asked them to concentrate on studio work, rather than performing live. "We were originally discovered busking ... so I would have thought it was obvious that we loved performing live, yet Sony weren't interested", said Karen England.

The Opera Babes have performed in concert with orchestras such as the Philharmonia, the Halle, the Royal Philharmonic Orchestra, the BBC Concert Orchestra, the Royal Liverpool Philharmonic Orchestra, the Royal Scottish National Orchestra, the London Symphony Orchestra, and the Berlin Symphony Orchestra, among others. They also performed for Queen Elizabeth II at the Festival of Remembrance at the Royal Albert Hall, the launch of the Commonwealth Games at Buckingham Palace, and Proms at the Palace for the Queen's Jubilee celebrations. They have also performed at the Los Angeles Opera House with Plácido Domingo, and were the first British classical act to perform in Las Vegas. In 2003 they performed Beethoven's "Ode to Joy" with André Rieu. They have performed on GMTV, Des & Mel, Good Morning America and Fox and Friends. The Opera Babes have also been the subject of three UK documentaries for ITV and one US documentary for CBS. Since 2005, the Opera Babes have been Ambassadors of SOS Children's Villages, an international orphan charity providing homes and mothers for orphaned and abandoned children.

The Opera Babes' second album, Renaissance, another classical and "crossover" collection, was released in 2006 on the independent label, Instant Karma UK. Swansea's Home Front magazine wrote, "Renaissance is really superb. Tracks include 'Casta Diva' [from the opera Norma], 'Pie Jesu,' 'Clair de Lune', and Stephen Sondheim's 'Send in the Clowns'.... If you only buy one classical album, buy this one!" The Opera Babes' 2006 "Renaissance" concert toured songs from both of their albums performed with multi-media special effects and visuals, as well as dancers costumed by designer Elizabeth Emanuel. In December 2006, they were featured on the UK's Songs of Praise programme recorded at Lichfield Cathedral. In the spring of 2007, they continued to tour in the UK and the US, and then the group took a break while Karen England had a baby. The group resumed touring in 2008. After this tour, the duo performed on cruise ships, among other venues.

In 2012, the group released its third album, Silent Noon, named after the song by Ralph Vaughan Williams, on the Warner Classics label. The album consists of British songs, from Handel and Purcell, to Quilter, to Britten and Novello, accompanied by piano. The Allmusic review commented that the duo's "calling card was the blend of their remarkably similar voices, and that's intact here. Yet an upbeat number or two wouldn't have been out of order".

== Recordings ==
- Beyond Imagination (Audio CD – 2002) Sony. Billboard 200 #199; UK #24; No. 1 on the UK Classical Chart; and No. 4 on the US Billboard Classical Crossover Albums chart
- Renaissance (Audio – CD 2006) Instant Karma UK
- Silent Noon (Audio – CD 2012) Warner Classics
