= Donald Maxwell (baritone) =

British opera singer and director

Donald Maxwell (born 12 December 1948) is a Scottish operatic baritone, director and teacher. He has sung with all of the leading British opera companies, as well as La Scala, Milan, Metropolitan Opera, Paris Opéra, Vienna Staatsoper, Teatro Colon, Buenos Aires and Théâtre Musical de Paris, among others. He has also sung on the concert stage, in performances broadcast on radio and television, and on recordings.

== Biography ==
Maxwell was born in Perth, Scotland, and studied geography at the University of Edinburgh, and singing with Joseph Hislop. He taught geography from 1971 to 1976 while singing with several amateur groups in Scotland.

In 1977, Maxwell began his professional opera career with Scottish Opera. He also performed in the light entertainment duo "Music Box" with Linda Ormiston. He has performed both leading and character roles since then, including major roles in several operas by each of Leoš Janáček, Benjamin Britten, Arthur Sullivan and Giuseppe Verdi. He was Artistic Director of the Buxton Festival, Director of the National Opera Studio and Head of Opera Studies at the Royal Welsh College of Music and Drama for several years. Since 1987, Maxwell has been a regular performer with The Royal Opera. He performs regularly with the National Gilbert & Sullivan Opera Company at the International Gilbert and Sullivan Festival and gives an annual masterclass in Taunton, Somerset, presented by, but not restricted to, Somerset Opera, of which he is patron.

Maxwell's recordings include roles in Amahl and the Night Visitors, The Marriage of Figaro, Noye's Fludde, Carmina Burana, A Midsummer Night's Dream, The Rape of Lucretia, Missa Sabrinensis (Howells), The Beggar's Opera (Britten's adaptation), The Firebrand of Florence, Cox and Box, The Contrabandista, Trial by Jury, Patience, The Mikado, The Yeomen of the Guard, The Maid of the Mountains, Kismet, Bitter Sweet, The Student Prince, Sir John in Love and an album of Scottish songs, among others. He also played the title character in the Carl Rosa Opera Company's 2001 film of The Mikado.
