= Gillian Knight =

English opera singer and actress

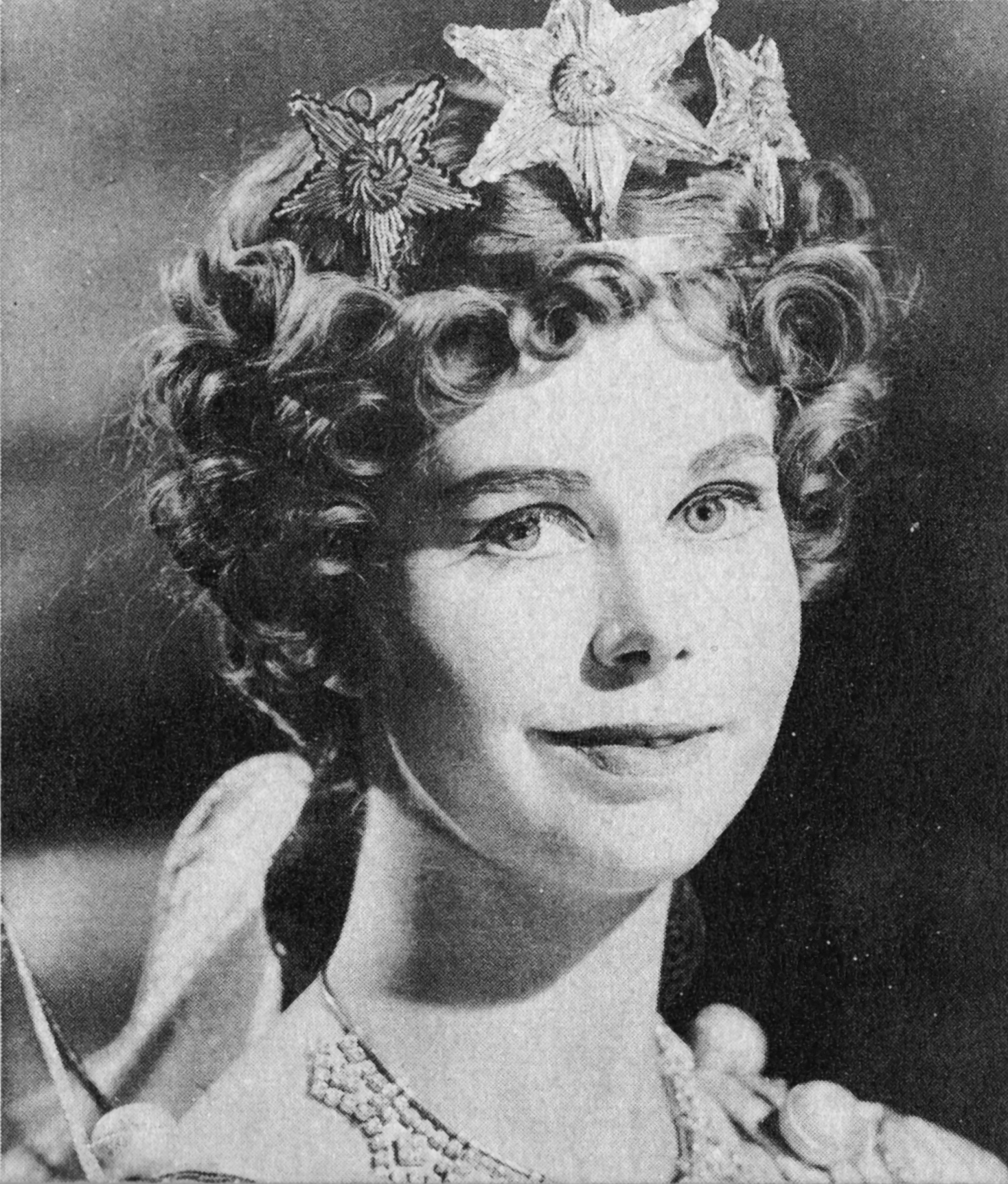
Knight as the Fairy Queen in Iolanthe

Gillian Knight (born 1 November 1934) is an English opera singer and actress, known for her performances in the contralto roles of the Savoy operas. After six years from 1959 to 1965 starring in these roles with the D'Oyly Carte Opera Company, Knight began a grand opera career.

Knight joined Sadler's Wells Opera (now known as English National Opera) in 1968 and, in 1970, went on to the Royal Opera, where she performed numerous roles over a period of more than three decades. Knight has performed with many other opera companies in Britain, Europe and America and at houses internationally and has recorded many of her Gilbert and Sullivan and grand opera roles.

== Beginnings and D'Oyly Carte years ==
Knight was born in Redditch, Worcestershire, England, and educated in Birmingham. She won a five-year scholarship to the Royal Academy of Music (RAM), where she studied with May Blythe and Roy Henderson. She sang in concerts, oratorio and on television with the Linden Singers while still at the Academy.

In mid-1959, upon graduating the RAM, Knight joined the D'Oyly Carte Opera Company at the age of 24, going on tour in August in eight of the leading contralto roles in the Gilbert and Sullivan repertory, succeeding the ailing Ann Drummond-Grant as the company's principal contralto. The Times wrote, "Many good Savoyards have regretted Gilbert's unkind lampooning of the unattractive elderly female ... and we have observed with gratitude that Buttercup, Ruth, Lady Jane and their equivalents are acted this season by a pleasing and personable young lady. ... Knight's Buttercup is in itself an iconoclastic impersonation." Before even beginning to tour with the company, her first performance with the company was to play the role of Little Buttercup in the company's recording of H.M.S. Pinafore released in 1960, the first Gilbert and Sullivan recording to include complete dialogue. Knight later said that she can hear her own inexperience on that recording.

Knight spent almost six years with D'Oyly Carte, appearing in the roles of Little Buttercup, Ruth in The Pirates of Penzance, Lady Jane in Patience, the Fairy Queen in Iolanthe, Lady Blanche in Princess Ida, Katisha in The Mikado, Dame Hannah in Ruddigore, Dame Carruthers in The Yeomen of the Guard, and the Duchess of Plaza-Toro in The Gondoliers.

Knight married D'Oyly Carte master carpenter Trevor Morrison in 1960. She left the D'Oyly Carte company in 1965, and soon afterwards the couple's daughter, Rebecca, was born. Rebecca Knight later became an opera singer.

== Sadler's Wells and Royal Opera years ==
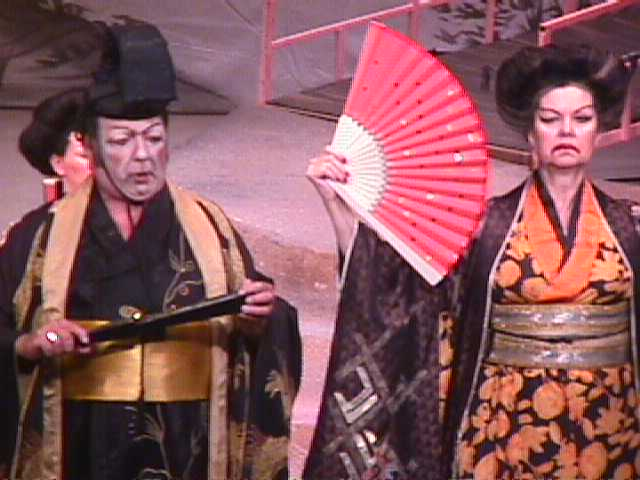
Knight as Katisha in The Mikado alongside Michael Rayner as the title character

In 1968, Knight joined Sadler's Wells Opera, making her debut as Ragonde in Count Ory. The Times noted, "Gillian Knight has a formidable stage presence as Ragonde, and a superbly articulated contralto to match." For Sadler's Wells she also played, among other roles, Suzuki in Madama Butterfly, Berta in The Barber of Seville, Maddalena in Rigoletto, Isabella in The Italian Girl in Algiers, Dryade in Ariadne on Naxos, the title role in Iolanthe ("most warmly, touchingly sung", wrote The Times), Lady Jane in Patience, and the title role in Bizet's Carmen, which she was soon invited to play at the Royal Opera House, Covent Garden. For the Handel Opera Society, she appeared at Sadler's Wells Theatre in Xerxes in 1970.

In 1970, Knight made her Covent Garden debut as the Page in Salome. In the same year she took over the role of Carmen from Tatiana Troyanos, and in a later revival she succeeded Grace Bumbry in the part. Alan Blyth in The Times wrote of her performance, "Miss Knight conveyed more than any recent Carmen in this house the sense of doom in Bizet's marvellous writing... going to her end, like all the best Carmens, with an almost heroic insolence." The role brought her to international attention, and she performed it opposite Plácido Domingo. She also performed at Covent Garden in Arabella; The Bartered Bride; The Cunning Little Vixen; Eugene Onegin; Falstaff; The Fiery Angel; The Golden Cockerel; Iphigénie en Tauride; Jenůfa; Die Meistersinger; Rigoletto; the Ring cycle; Der Rosenkavalier; Semele; La traviata; Il trovatore; Otello;, Wozzeck and others. Among modern operas at Covent Garden, Knight appeared in the premieres of Peter Maxwell Davies's Taverner; Hans Werner Henze's We Come to the River; Nicholas Maw's Sophie's Choice; Michael Tippett's King Priam; and Alexander Zemlinsky's The Dwarf.

Other opera venues where Knight has sung include the Paris Opéra, the Tanglewood Festival, and Pittsburgh, Frankfurt, Basel (where she sang in the premiere of Faust by Luca Lombardi), Scottish Opera, Opera North, the New Israeli Opera, and the Wexford Festival, where she appeared in Adrien Boieldieu's La dame blanche and Édouard Lalo's Le roi d'Ys. In 1981, Knight played The Old Lady in Leonard Bernstein's Candide, and the following year she sang the title role in The Grand Duchess of Gerolstein at Southern Methodist University in Dallas, Texas. Between 1984 and 1990, she sang Ruth in Pirates, Buttercup in Pinafore, and Katisha in The Mikado for the summer opera seasons presented by The Lyric Opera of Dallas. In 1988 she appeared with the revived D'Oyly Carte Opera Company as Dame Carruthers in Yeomen and the Fairy Queen in Iolanthe, in which the critic Arthur Jacobs said she sang and acted "with more richness and energy than ever". She has said that one of her most challenging and satisfying roles was Die Amme (the nurse) in Die Frau ohne Schatten at Welsh National Opera with Charles Mackerras. A 1989 review in The Musical Times commented, "The Nurse, a role which requires a singer with an immense and consistently strong range, was sung with thrilling aplomb by Gillian Knight, whose portrayal of this evil puppet-mistress was thoroughly, and properly, nasty."Beginning in the 1990s, Knight toured in Gilbert and Sullivan productions with the Carl Rosa Opera Company. In 1999, she sang Kabanicha in Janáček's Katya Kabanova for Opera North. During these years, Knight also performed regularly on the concert platform.

Away from opera Knight's concert work in London included Rossini concerts in 1968 and 1978, Haydn's Nelson Mass with István Kertész and the London Symphony Orchestra, and Rossini's Stabat Mater, with the same forces in 1971, and Stravinsky's Les Noces with BBC forces conducted by Pierre Boulez in 1972.

== Later career ==
In later years, Knight performed several roles with the Gilbert and Sullivan Opera Company at The International Gilbert and Sullivan Festival in Buxton, England, and Philadelphia, Pennsylvania. She returned to the Royal Opera House in 2003 to sing in Elektra.

In 2004, Knight reprised the role of Ruth in Pirates with the Lyric Opera of Chicago. Chicago radio host Bruce Duffie said, after seeing that production, "Knight is one of those great personalities who simply go about their business season after season, giving splendid renditions of various roles ... while not going far afield very often and, thus, passing up the opportunity for real world-wide stardom". Knight told Duffie: "I'm getting a bit controversial here, but there is a snobbish attitude towards Gilbert and Sullivan in the opera world. ... I believe in excellence. Now I believe that if Gilbert and Sullivan is done well ... then it is excellent, and it should be in a [major opera] house".

== Recordings ==
With the D'Oyly Carte Opera Company and Decca Records, she recorded Little Buttercup (1960), the Queen of the Fairies (1960), Lady Jane (1961), the Duchess of Plaza-Toro (1961), Dame Hannah (1962) and Dame Carruthers (1964). She was also Kate in a 1966 BBC radio broadcast of Pirates and was the voice of Dame Hannah in the 1967 Halas and Batchelor cartoon version of Ruddigore.

Knight appeared as Ruth in the 1982 Brent Walker television production of Pirates. In 1989 she recorded seven roles in a BBC radio series of the operas: Lady Sangazure in The Sorcerer, Buttercup, Lady Jane, Fairy Queen, Katisha, Lady Sophy in Utopia Limited, and the Baroness von Krakenfeldt in The Grand Duke. In 1993 she was Ruth in the Welsh National Opera recording of Pirates, and in 1997 she was a soloist in a BBC 2 G&S concert broadcast from Cheltenham. Knight plays Katisha on the Carl Rosa 2001 video and CD recordings of The Mikado and was a soloist on the Symposium CD recording of Sullivan's cantata, The Martyr of Antioch, from the 2000 International Gilbert and Sullivan Festival.

Prominent among Knight's operatic recordings is Madama Butterfly (1978), in the role of Suzuki, opposite Renata Scotto and Plácido Domingo, conducted by Lorin Maazel for CBS/Sony. Knight also appears in Maazel's recordings of Suor Angelica (1975), Il tabarro (1977), and La Rondine (1983).

Knight's other audio recordings include Mozart's masses, "Credo", "Coronation" and K427, conducted by Colin Davis. Her other opera recordings include La damnation de Faust (2001), and Dido and Aeneas (1971), conducted by Davis (1971); La forza del destino (1977), conducted by James Levine; Moses und Aron (1975), conducted by Pierre Boulez; Parsifal (1973) and La traviata (1995), conducted by Georg Solti; Rigoletto (1971), conducted by Richard Bonynge; and ENO's Ring cycle, conducted by Reginald Goodall, recorded live by EMI between 1973 and 1977 and released on CD by Chandos Records in 2001.

On video are the Covent Garden production of Salome (1992) in Peter Hall's production, The Cunning Little Vixen (1992), and La traviata (1995). She also appears in a wide range of specialist recordings for the Reader's Digest, notably the Timeless Favourites series of 3-CD sets produced by Jay Productions between 1995 and 2000. In a 2004 interview, Knight said, "I don't think I've ever been satisfied with a recording. I haven't played all my recordings. Some of them I haven't heard. I haven't seen... the video that I did of Salome from Covent Garden.... [P]erhaps when I'm not singing any more, I'll dig it out and watch it.... I listen and I'll think, 'Yes, but I could have done this or that'".
