= Ian Belsey =

British baritone singer and actor

Ian Belsey (born 1962) is an English singer and actor specialising in baritone opera roles of the bel canto period, but he is best known for his performances in light music and operetta, particularly the works of Gilbert and Sullivan.

== Biography ==
Belsey was born in Bromley, making his stage debut in 1970 at the age of 8 at the Pier Theatre, Bournemouth in The Sooty Show. He studied at the Royal Academy of Dancing, the Guildhall School of Music & Drama and at the Royal College of Music, both in the Opera School and as a post-graduate.

=== Early career ===
Belsey has appeared in opera and the works of Gilbert and Sullivan at theatres and concert halls throughout the United Kingdom and in France, Germany, Holland, Spain, New York, Bermuda, the Far East and aboard the QE2 on the World Cruise.

He was a principal baritone with the Regency Opera Company in Tosca and The Marriage of Figaro (1986), English Festival Opera's La boheme (1995) and Pimlico Opera's tour of La Traviata, as well as baritone soloist in the Magic of Broadway in Yarmouth and Iolanthe for Opera Options at Hever Castle. He also performed Mountararat in Iolanthe and Mentchikoff in The Count of Luxembourg in the 1990s for the D'Oyly Carte Opera Company. He has been a guest artist for the Welsh National Opera and the Northern Sinfonia and has given vocal master classes at leading drama schools in England. He has also appeared in the International Covent Garden Festival's productions of Trial by Jury.

His musical theatre work includes productions of Evita (Opera House Manchester), Cats (Opera House Blackpool), the national and international tour of Chess, Passarino & Mousieur Andre in The Phantom of the Opera (Her Majesty's Theatre, London 1998) and an extensive national tour of King's Rhapsody. His other work includes Stairway to the Stars, Hello, Dolly!, My One and Only (all at the London Palladium), the Cole Porter Centennial Gala at the Prince Edward Theatre, Mr Wonderful at the Theatre Royal, Drury Lane, and the Italian Singer in Around the World in Eighty Minutes at the Royal Albert Hall, all of which have been recorded for radio and on CD.

He was a baritone soloist with Hinge and Bracket, appearing at their Prom Nights, culminating in their 21st Anniversary Gala at The Royal Festival Hall in 1995.

=== Later projects ===
Belsey has appeared with Opera della Luna as Captain Corcoran in several of their productions of H.M.S. Pinafore since 2001. Since 2004, he has appeared as the Sergeant of Police in Opera della Luna's productions of The Parson's Pirates, as the title role in The Mikado, as Sir Roderic Murgatroyd in The Ghosts of Ruddigore, La Belle Helene, and The Tales of Hoffmann. He appeared in the company's 2008 productions of Moonstruck and The Amorous Goldfish.

He has also played Major General Stanley in The Pirates of Penzance, Eisenstein in Die Fledermaus and the Lord Chancellor in Iolanthe at The Sevenoaks Festival. He was Papageno in The Magic Flute with New Devon Opera in 2005 ("quite superb throughout"). He appeared at the Wigmore Hall in the children's entertainment, The Magic Flute & The Broomstick, written by Simon Butteriss. In 2008, Belsey played Apollo in Thespis at the Normansfield Theatre, Teddington, which was the first professional British production since 1872.
