= Iford Manor =

Manor house in Wiltshire, England

Coordinates: 51.32885°N 2.28556°W

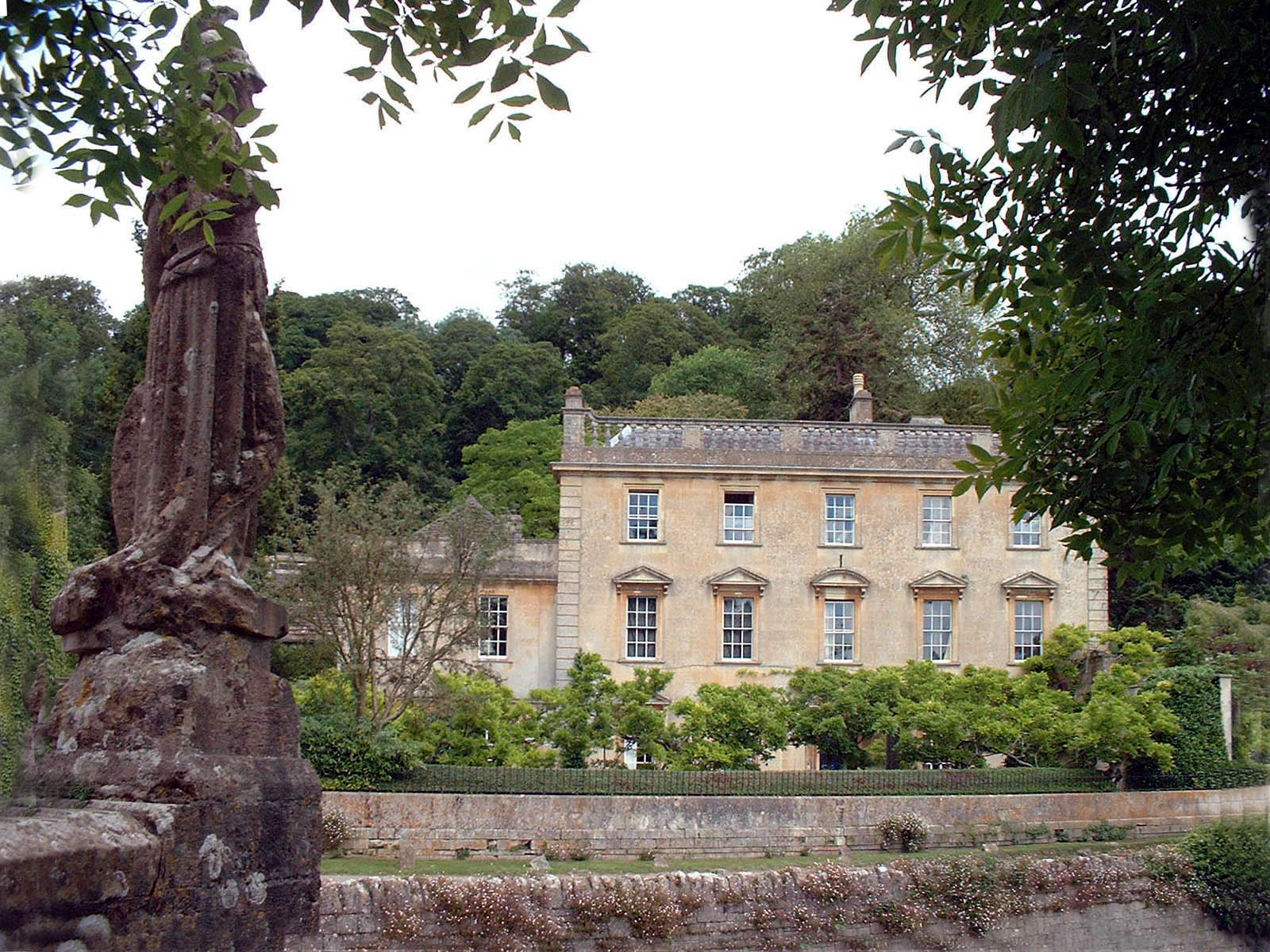
Iford Manor with statue on the River Frome

Iford Manor (grid reference ST802589) is a manor house in Wiltshire, England. It is a Grade II* listed building sitting on the steep, south-facing slope of the Frome valley, in Westwood parish, about 2 miles (3.2 km) southwest of the town of Bradford-on-Avon. Its Grade I registered gardens are open to the public from April to September each year.

Iford was rated as among the "20 most beautiful villages in the UK and Ireland" by Condé Nast Traveler in 2020, with the manor taking "center stage".

== History ==
There has been a dwelling here since the Domesday Book and the origins of the present house are as early as the late fifteenth century or the early sixteenth. At that time the buildings were a wool factory and the seat of the Horton family who became a wool dynasty. Thereafter the Hungerford family of nearby Farleigh Hungerford Castle and Corsham Court lived here. Following a change in ownership the classical the building was remodelled; the façade was added around 1725–30.

Three generations of the Gaisford family lived here in the Georgian period, notably Dean Gaisford of Christ Church, Oxford; his father John had purchased the property in 1777.

Previously, the estate was owned by the Chandler family who was responsible for the modifications in the early eighteenth century. The Gaisfords created pleasure grounds with a park and woodland. In approximately 1820, the Gaisford family bought an old house in the area (later demolished) in order to extend the grounds of their manor. The Gaisford family owned the estate until 1853 and were responsible for planting the hanging woodlands above the garden and several of the notable trees in the garden and surrounding landscape. The Rooke family lived here until Harold Peto purchased the property in 1899. After Peto's death, the estate was inherited by family and was sold in 1965 to Elizabeth Cartwright (later, Cartwright-Hignett). Her restoration of the garden was completed in the early 1970s.

The family (William and Marianne Cartwright-Hignett) retained ownership of the manor as of October 2020. The gardens were open to visitors for many years but were closed in 2020 due to the COVID-19 pandemic. A coffee shop was being added, to open in April 2021; the tea room continued in operation. In 2020, the cloister and Georgian summer house were repaired to prevent their collapse.

== Gardens ==
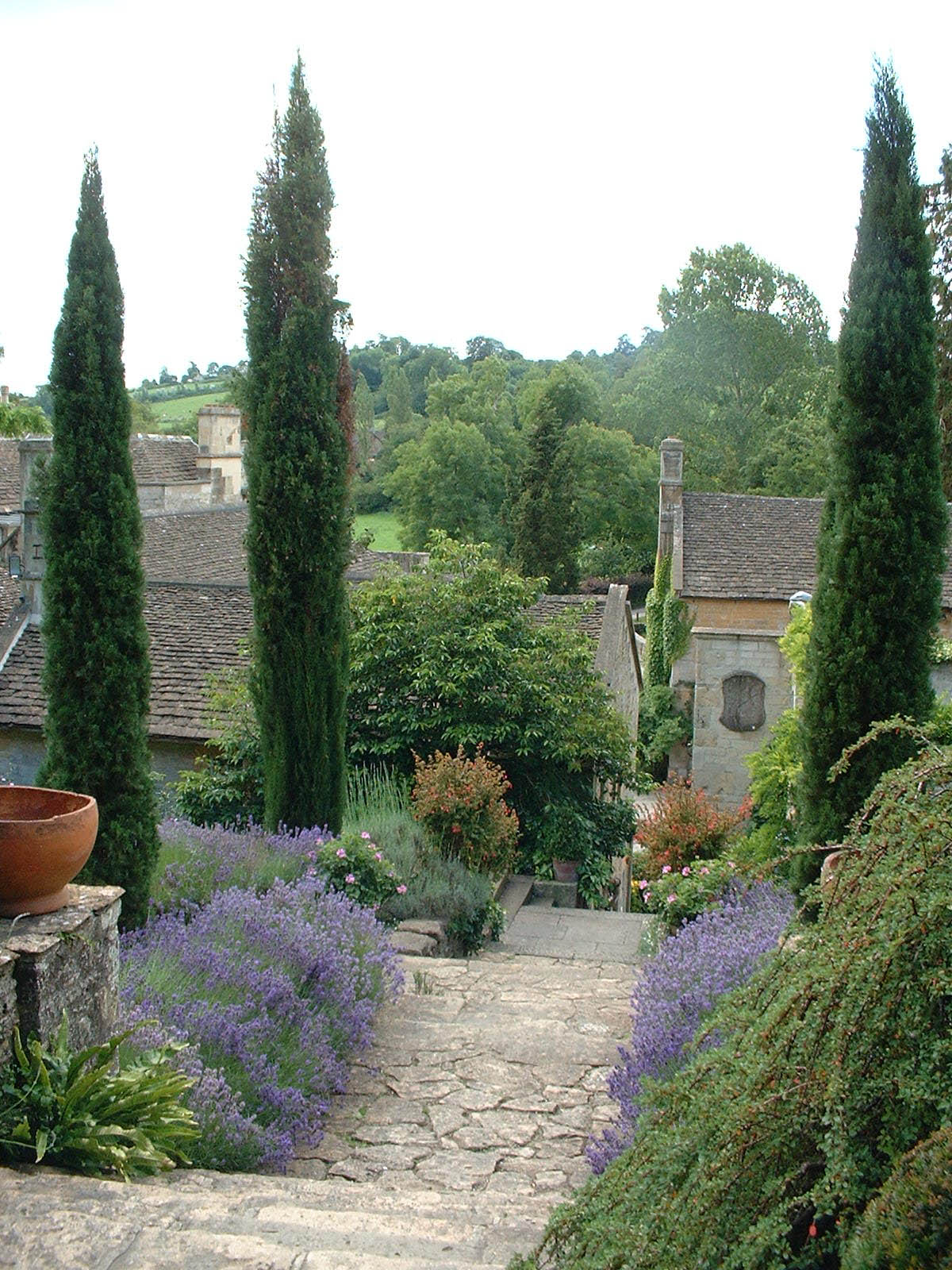
The Peto Gardens

Iford is best known for its beautiful gardens, which are designated Grade I in the National Register of Historic Parks and Gardens by Historic England. They were designed during the early part of the twentieth century by the garden architect Harold Peto. He lived at Iford from 1899 until his death in 1933 during which time he built up an extensive collection of antiquities and artefacts, brought back from his travels abroad. His great love of the Italian garden style is plainly evident at Iford, where flowers occupy a subordinate place amongst the more structural elements of cypress, statuary, hedges, water features and broad walks.

According to Country Life, Peto was searching for a country home that would lend itself to a great garden design. When he found the Palladian villa in Wiltshire, "it was evocative of his favourite... the Villa Giusti at Verona. ... He avoided unnecessary change to the garden, preferring instead to develop the inherent character, the natural beauty and the historic atmosphere".

A number of plants of particular interest can be found at Iford: standard Wisteria sinensis blossoms across much of the front of the house and up flights of steps linking the terraces (particularly good in late May); Phillyrea latifolia; Buxus sempervirens grows in wild tree form in the woods above the house and is extensively used in the gardens as a structural plant; Cupressus sempervirens; Hemerocallis citrina, the scented daylily; the naturalised Martagon lily.

In addition to his planting and structural work, Peto created a number of architectural garden features, which remain well preserved. Behind the manor house, to which he added a loggia, terraces lead up to the main lawn. Alongside the lawn he built a lily pool, a colonnade-lined Great Terrace, and the Cloisters, a Grade II* listed Italianate courtyard surrounded by an arcade, which was his "Haunt of Ancient Peace" where he displayed many of his treasures. Higher up the hillside, he built more terraces with retaining walls, and a pavilion called the Casita.

Thought lost after the war, the present owners since 1965, the Cartwright-Hignett family, have restored the garden and the various structures therein, initially assisted by Lanning Roper. John Hignett has extended the garden, including the creation of a Japanese Garden. The owners appointed Troy Scott Smith in 2019, previously head gardener of Sissinghurst, Bodnant and The Courts, to help replant and expand the garden further.

Iford Manor was the recipient of the Historic Houses Association/Christie's Garden of the Year Award in 1998, and the Little Treasure of Britain Award in the 2017 Group Travel Awards.

== Arts and filming ==
Iford Manor has been used for filming on a number of occasions. Most recently it was used as a key location for The Secret Garden (2020) and in Sanditon (ITV 2019). In 2008 the gardens and the cloisters were used as the venue for the wedding sequence in Episode 1 of the second series of the BBC's Mistresses.

Regular concerts take place at weekends in the garden at no extra charge for garden visitors, and from 2021 a new season of arts events will take place.

From 1983 until 2018, the Iford Arts Festival held a three-month season of opera, jazz and other concerts in the gardens, making use of the Cloisters and the Casita as performance spaces. With urgent repair work needed to the cloisters following subsidence, and the festival having outgrown the relatively small venue, the festival was moved to nearby Belcombe Court from 2019.

== Iford Manor SSSI ==
Iford Manor
- Site of Special Scientific Interest
- Location of Iford Manor.
- Area of search: Avon
- Grid reference: ST802589
- Interest: Biological
- Area: 0.39 hectares (1.0 acre)
- Notification date: 1996
- Location map: English Nature

The roof spaces of Iford Mill Barn are used as a summer breeding roost by greater horseshoe bats, one of only 14 known roosts for this species in England. This is the second largest of the known English breeding roosts, with over 250 individuals recorded each summer. Because of this, the buildings and a small area of land surrounding them, 0.39 hectares (1.0 acre), were notified as a biological Site of Special Scientific Interest in 1996. Although the manor itself is in Wiltshire, both bat breeding sites are in Bath and Northeast Somerset, and so fall within English Nature's Avon Area of Search. The SSSI includes an orchard, where Daubenton's bat and Noctule bat roost.

== Gallery ==
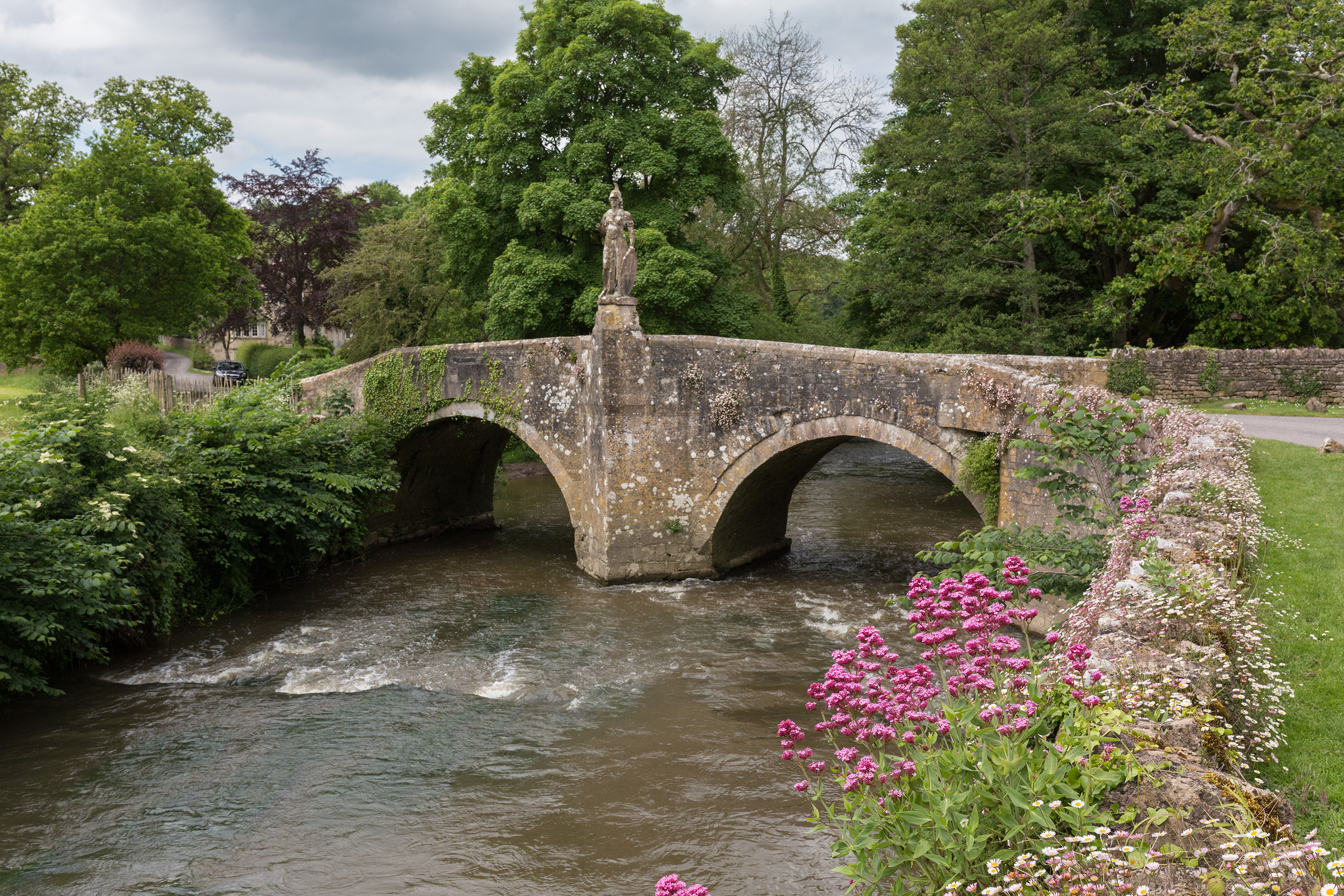
The bridge

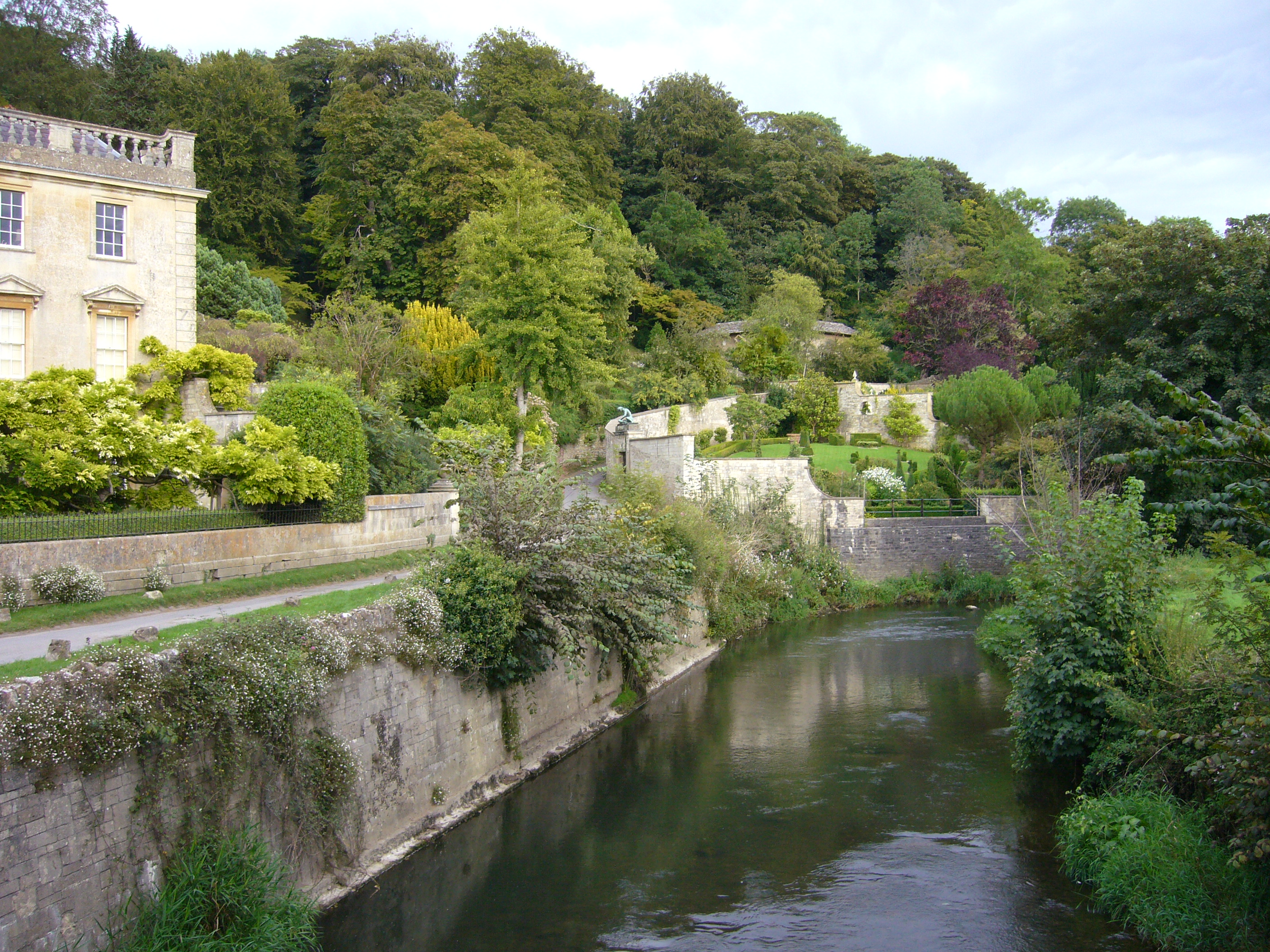
View from the bridge

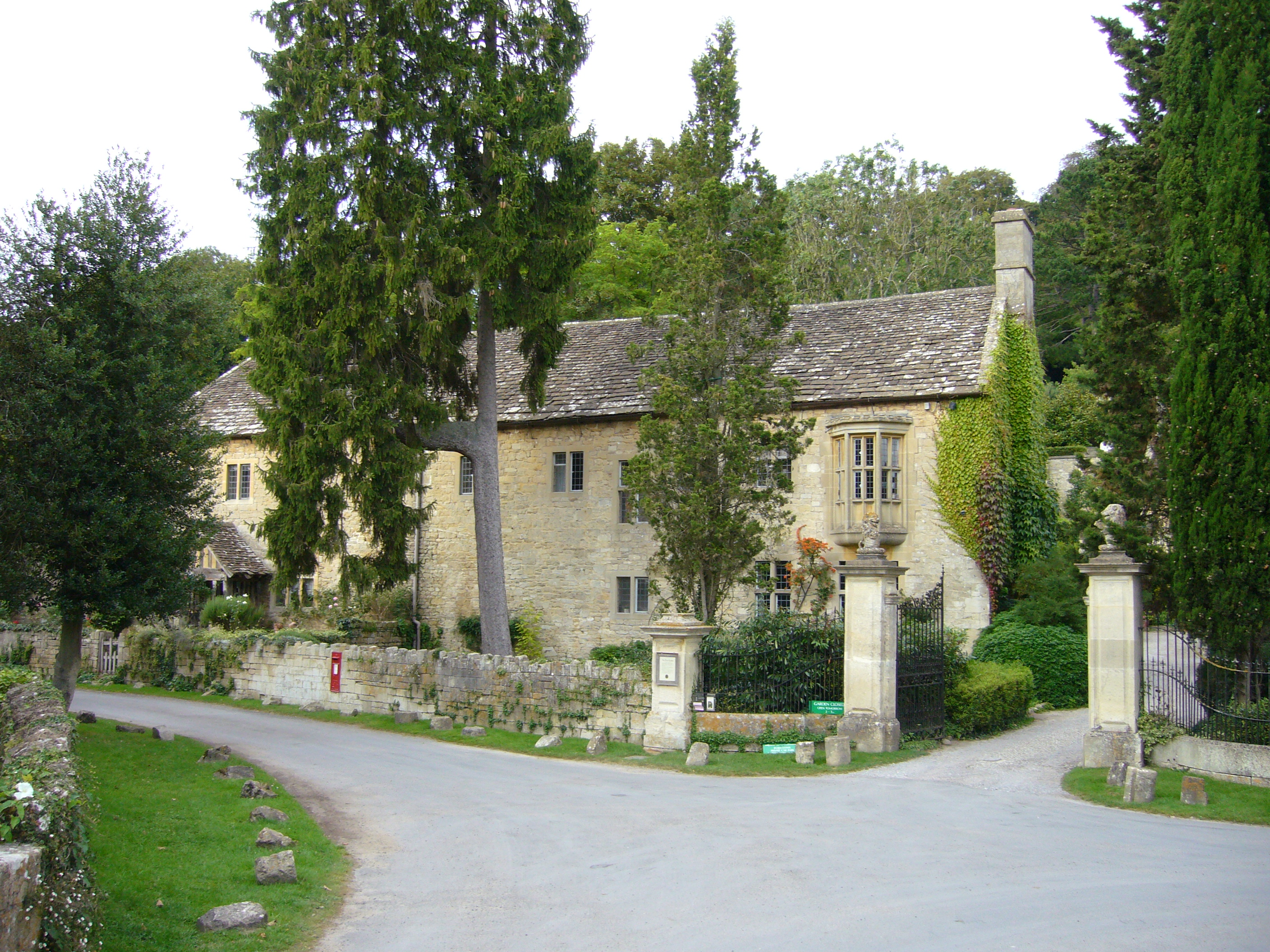
Entrance gates
