= Barry Clark (tenor) =

British opera singer and actor

Barry Clark (born 1950) is a retired English opera singer and actor. Beginning in the 1970s, Clark played tenor roles in the Savoy Operas for over a decade with the D'Oyly Carte Opera Company. He then sang in various opera companies, including New Sadler's Wells and Scottish Opera, and played in musicals on the West End. Later, Clark concentrated on oratorio and, in later years, appeared with the Carl Rosa Opera Company, among others.

== Early life and career ==
Born in Southampton, where he attended Regent's Park Secondary School, Clark made his first stage appearances as an amateur with the Southampton Operatic Society in Gilbert and Sullivan operas. He worked for the Ordnance Survey in Southampton, where he felt bored, before commencing his professional singing career with the D'Oyly Carte Opera Company at the age of 20, with whom he appeared from 1971 to 1982. There, he began in the chorus and then played small roles and understudied the principal Gilbert and Sullivan tenor roles. His first roles were the First Yeoman in The Yeomen of the Guard, which he played from 1974 until the company closed in 1982. In 1975, he began to play Francesco in The Gondoliers and the leading role of the Defendant in Trial by Jury. As understudy, he occasionally played the principal tenor roles of Alexis in The Sorcerer, Ralph Rackstraw in H.M.S. Pinafore, the Duke of Dunstable in Patience, Earl Tolloller in Iolanthe, Cyril in Princess Ida, Richard Dauntless in Ruddigore, Leonard Meryll and Colonel Fairfax in Yeomen, and Marco in The Gondoliers. Clark sings the role of Francesco on the 1977 D'Oyly Carte recording of The Gondoliers and First Yeoman on their 1979 recording of Yeomen.

During the 1980s he appeared with several leading opera companies, including New Sadler's Wells, with whom he played small roles including Lionel in Martha; Scottish Opera, with whom he sang a variety of roles including Don Ottavio in Don Giovanni and Pinkerton in Madama Butterfly (during which time he met his wife, Julia); and Dublin Grand Opera. He also sang the role of Fenton in Falstaff in Brighton and toured with such companies as Opera East, London Opera Players and Regency Opera, playing Don José in Carmen, Monostatos in The Magic Flute and Basilio in The Marriage of Figaro. He has also performed in pantomime and musicals.

Returning to operetta, Clark played Lord Failsham on a national tour of Ivor Novello's Perchance to Dream with Simon Ward (1985), and Camille in The Merry Widow (1986). In 1986, Clark created the role of the Auctioneer in The Phantom of the Opera and later played the tenor role of Piangi. He then joined Bristol Old Vic to sing Pirelli in Sweeney Todd and then Sir Peter Hall's Company for the musical Born Again, at Chichester. He also played the title role in The Student Prince at the Grand Opera House, Belfast, and Defendant in Trial by Jury at Queen Elizabeth Hall. In 1988 Clark sang with the London Savoyards as Ralph in H.M.S. Pinafore.

== Later years ==
Through most of the 1990s, Clark concentrated on concert work and oratorio. In 1997, however, he joined the concert group the Three British Tenors, performing arias from opera, operetta and musical theatre. In 1998, he wrote, directed and appeared as Richard D'Oyly Carte in Monarchs of All They Savoy, a play about W. S. Gilbert, Arthur Sullivan and Carte, at the Players Theatre, Charing Cross. For several seasons he appeared with the Carl Rosa Opera Company, singing Tolloller in Iolanthe, Nanki-Poo in The Mikado and Alfred in Die Fledermaus, before switching to comic roles such as the Duke of Plaza-Toro in The Gondoliers (2003), and Colonel Pritzich in The Merry Widow.

At the Covent Garden Festival he sang the Learned Judge in Trial by Jury and the title role in Mozart's The Impresario. In 2004, Clark played Bunthorne at the Gawsworth Festival 2004 in Patience. Returning to Carl Rosa, in 2005, Clark played Pish-Tush in The Mikado and toured South Africa as Baron Zeta in The Merry Widow. Also with Carl Rosa, in 2007 and 2008 he played Jack Point in The Yeomen of the Guard and the Major General in The Pirates of Penzance and in 2008 he played Tolloller in Iolanthe for Carl Rosa at the Gielgud Theatre. Clark also performed with the concert group "The Magic of Gilbert and Sullivan". He continued to perform with the touring company Tarantara Productions, which he co-founded, among other companies, until about 2024, after which he retired, except for some concert appearances.
