= East Dulwich Comedy =

Comedy club in London, England

Coordinates: 51.4599°N 0.075°W

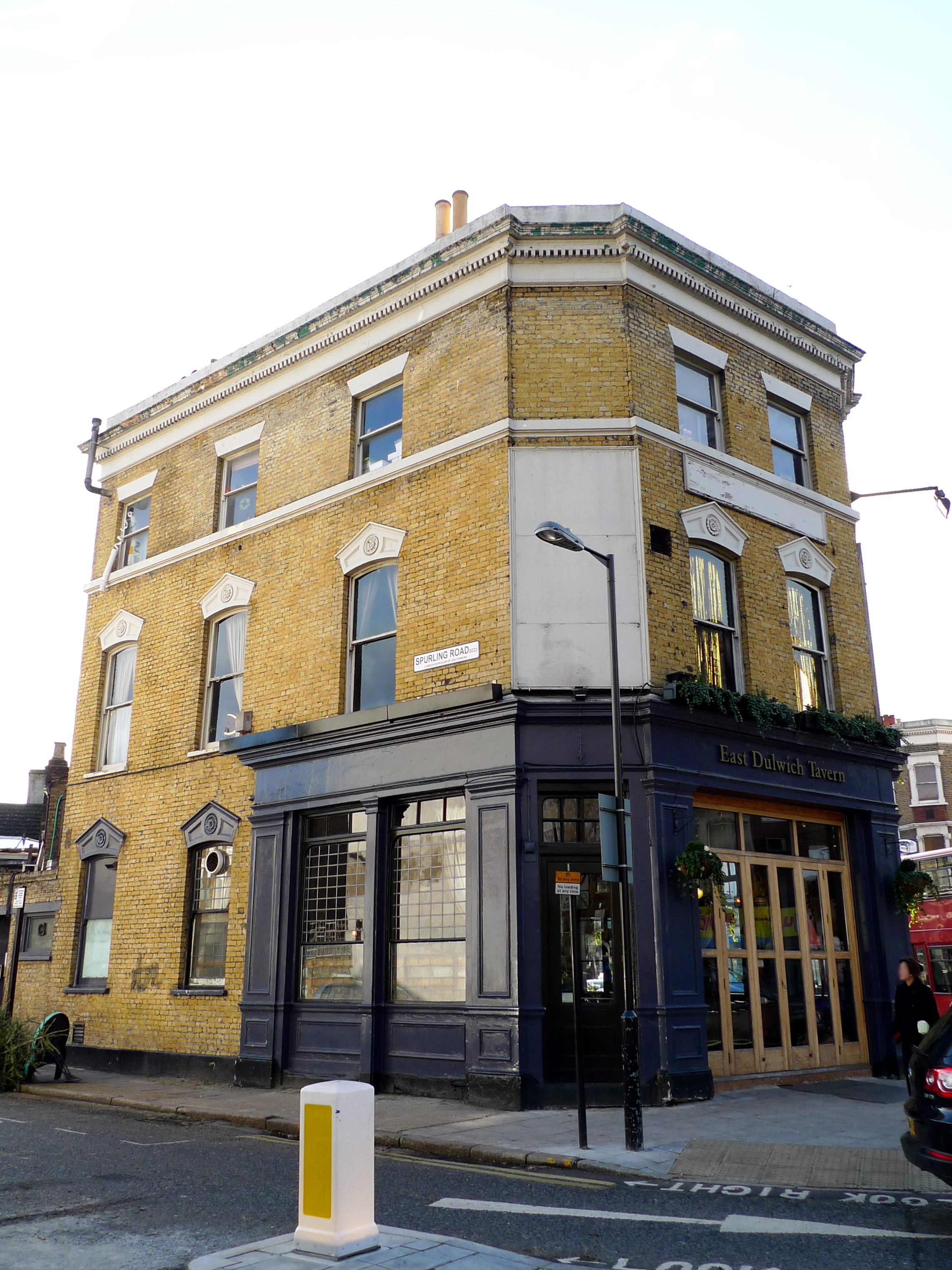
The East Dulwich comedy club began at the East Dulwich Tavern

East Dulwich Comedy was a British comedy club that started above the East Dulwich Tavern in East Dulwich in November 1988. It has also been located at the Magdala Tavern, 21 Lordship Lane, Southwark, and moved to the Hobgoblin pub in Forest Hill until the club's closure in 2015.

Over the years, the club played host to many well known comedians including Stephen Frost, Eddie Izzard, Jo Brand, Mark Lamarr, Bill Bailey, Mark Thomas, Jenny Eclair, Alan Davies, Harry Hill, Andy Parsons, Graham Norton, Jimmy Carr and Norman Lovett.
