= St Thomas More Church, Dulwich =

St Thomas More Catholic Church
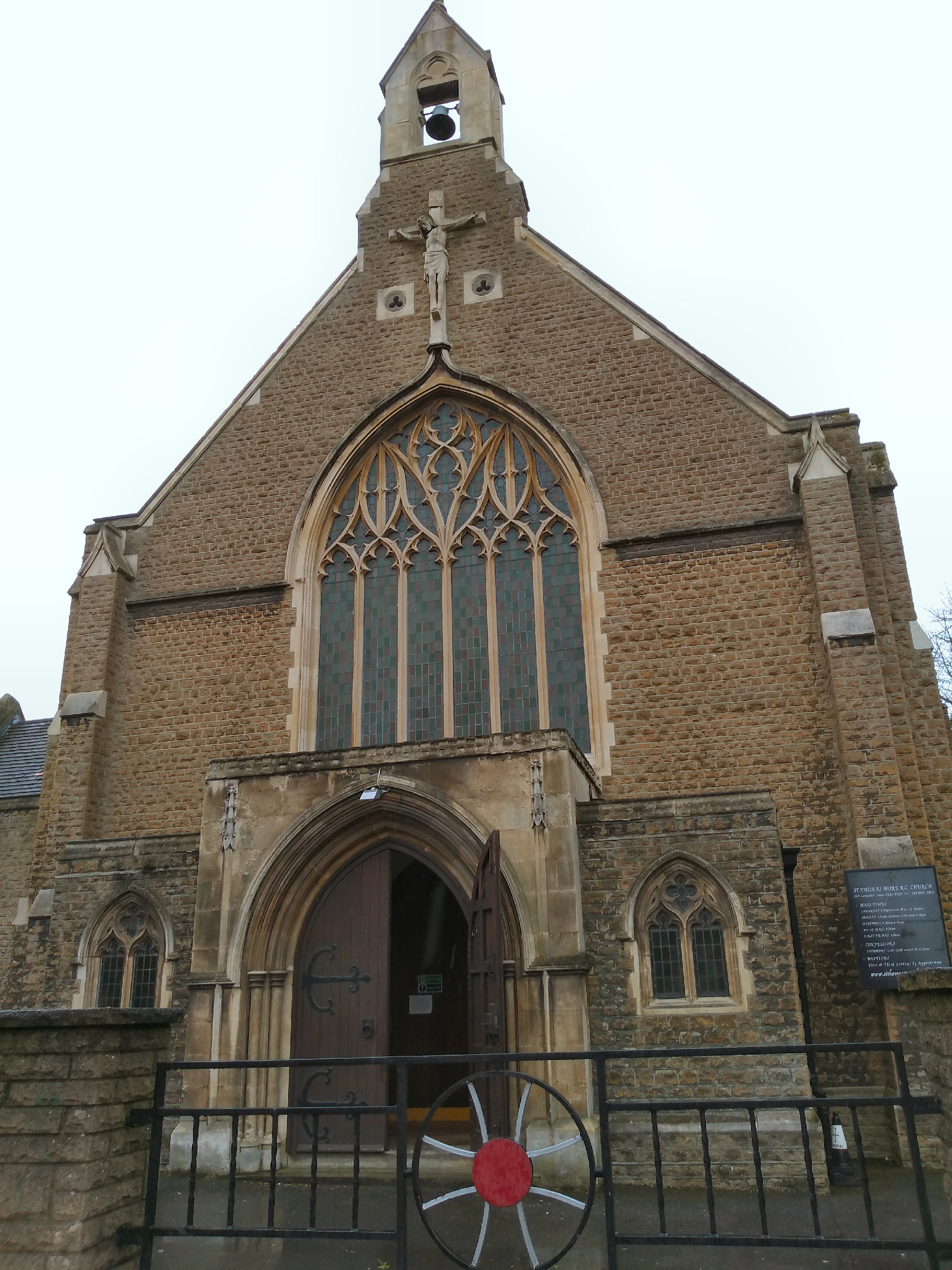
- Front of the church, as viewed from Lordship Lane

- Location within Greater London Location within England
- 51.448535°N 0.074266°W
- OS grid reference: TQ 33915 73930
- Location: East Dulwich, London
- Address: Lordship Lane, SE22
- Country: England
- Denomination: Catholic Church
- Website: www.stthomasmorechurch.co.uk

History
- Dedication: St Thomas More

Architecture
- Architect: Joseph Goldie

Administration
- Province: Ecclesiastical province of Southwark
- Archdiocese: Archdiocese of Southwark
- Deanery: Camberwell
- Parish: Dulwich

Clergy
- Priest: Fr Bartlomiej Dudek

St Thomas More Catholic Church is a Roman Catholic church in Lordship Lane, East Dulwich, London. It was designed by Joseph Goldie in 1929 and restored in 1953 after war damage. A lady chapel was built in 1970. The stained glass is by Patrick Pye. The statue of the Madonna and Child in the Lady Chapel is by Freda Skinner.

The reredos and altar of the church are from the former chapel of the Jesuit college in Hales Place, near Canterbury, Kent.

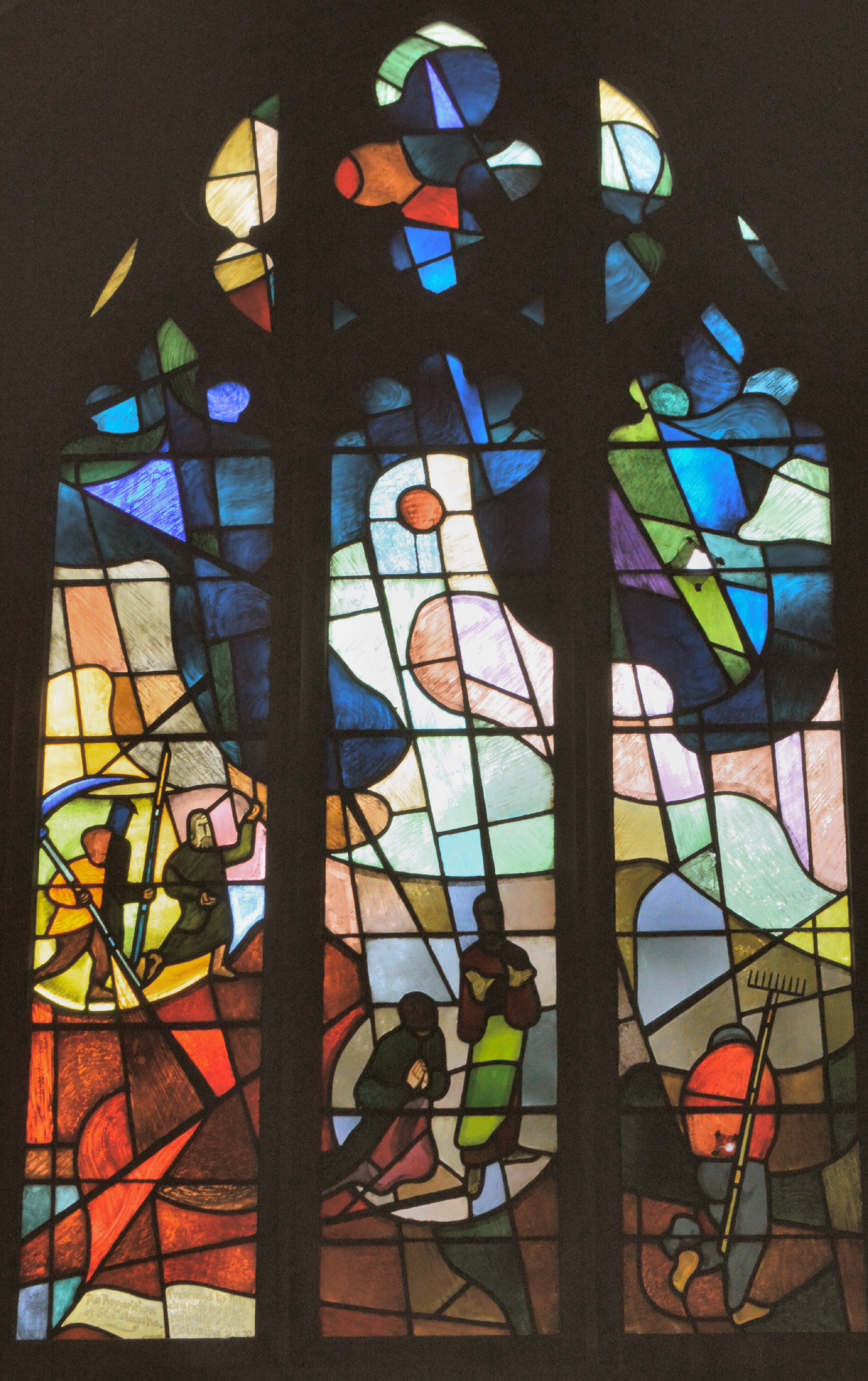
Apparition of St Columba by Patrick Pye

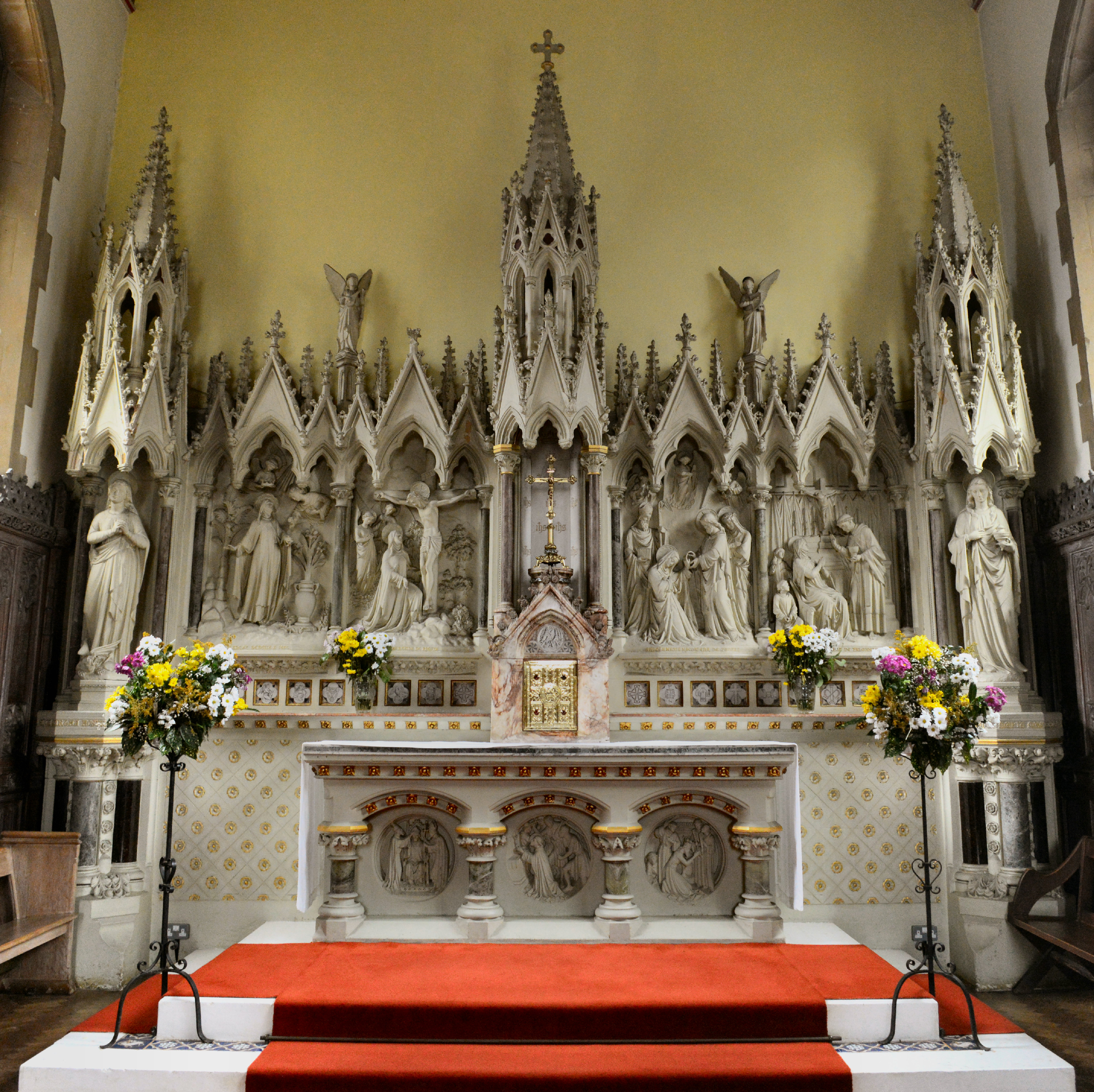
Caen stone reredos

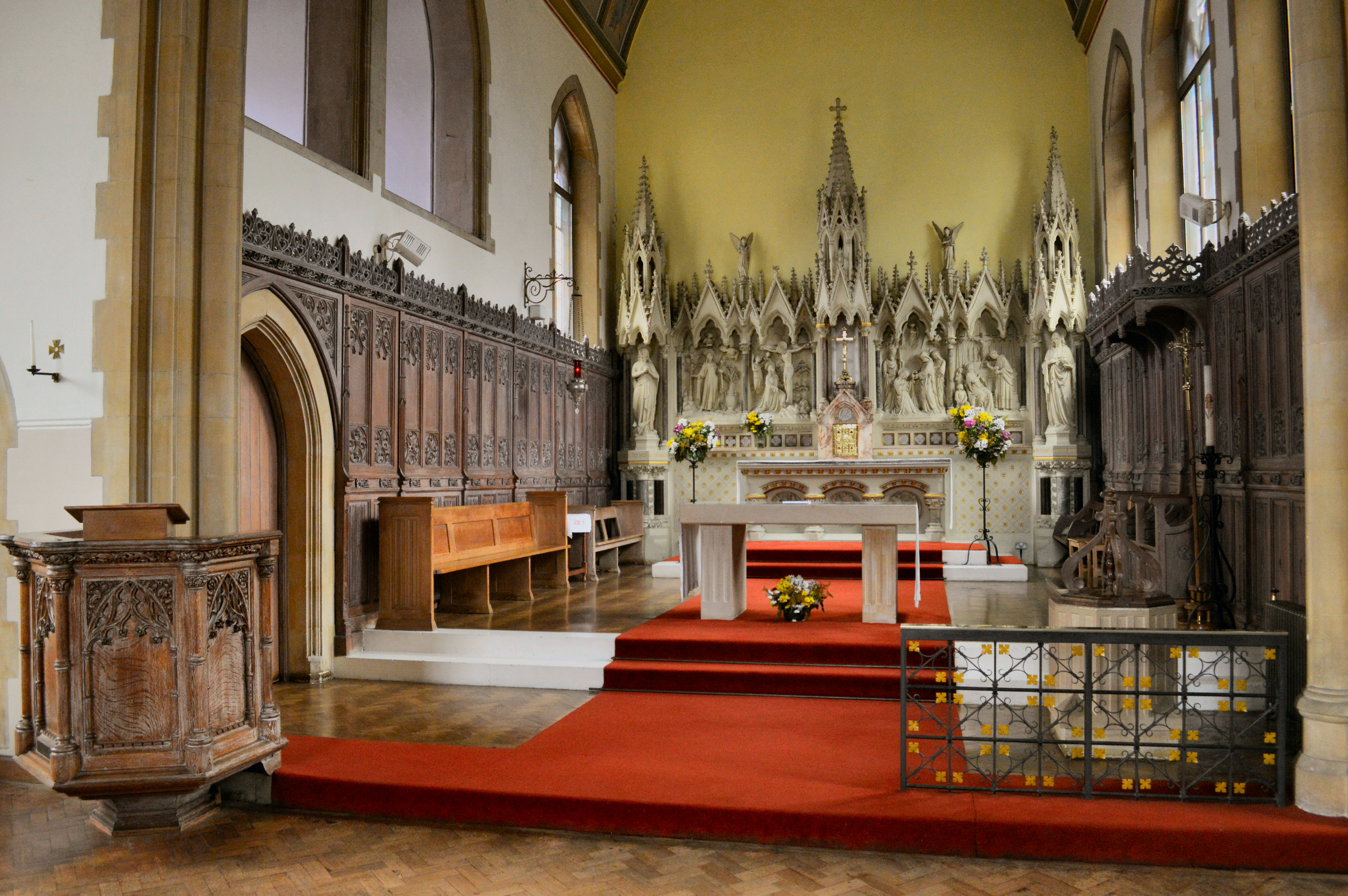
Chancel

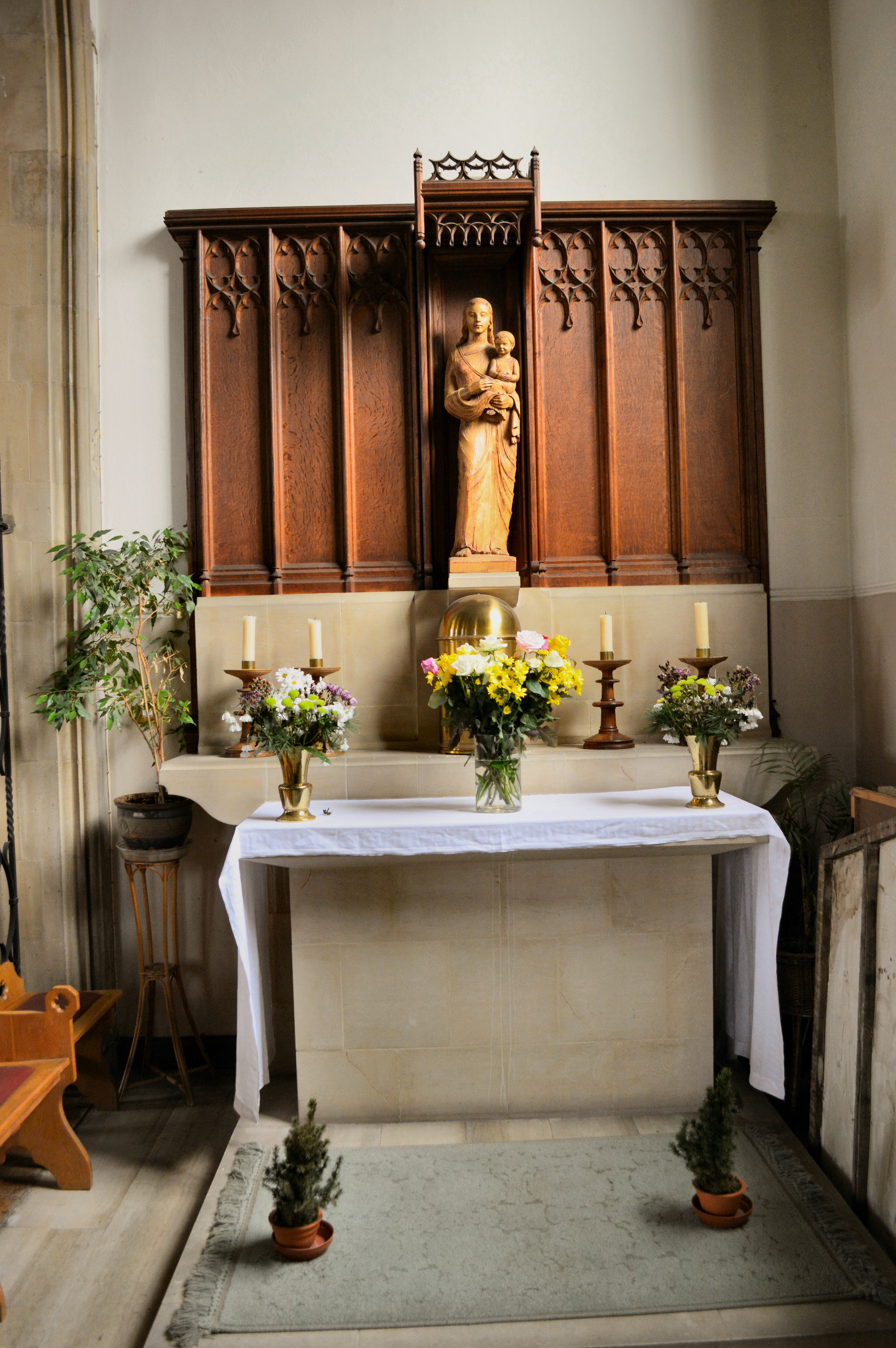
The Lady Chapel
