= Dulwich Library =

Library in Dulwich, southeast London, England

Coordinates: 51.4489°N 0.0746°W

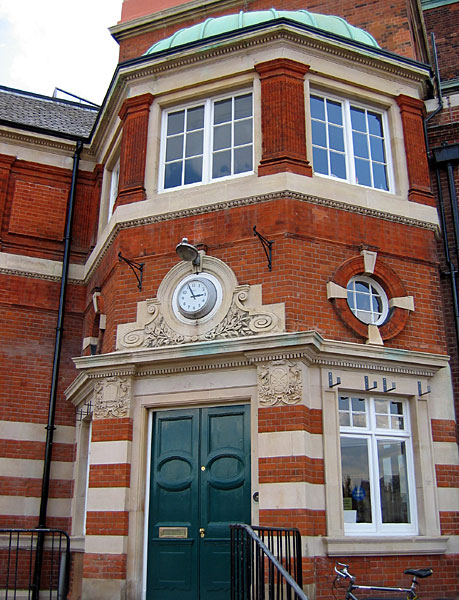
- 2004, Library frontage
- Location: 368 Lordship Lane, Dulwich, London SE22 8NB, England
- Type: Public
- Established: 24 November 1897; 128 years ago

Access and use
- Population served: 22,000 visitors a month

Other information
- Website: Official website

Dulwich Library opened on 24 November 1897. It is an example of a Passmore Edwards library and is located at No. 368 Lordship Lane in East Dulwich, southeast London, England.

The Library is managed by Southwark Council. The library has been listed Grade II on the National Heritage List for England since March 2016.

The library was designed by Charles Barry Jr. in his capacity as architect and surveyor to Alleyn’s College of God’s Gift (succeeded by the Dulwich Estate in 1995) who donated the site on which the library stands. It was built as a memorial to the Elizabethan actor Edward Alleyn, the founder of the College of God’s Gift. The foundation stone of the library was laid by the prominent actor Henry Irving on 24 September 1896, and the library was subsequently opened by the Lord Chancellor, Lord Halsbury, on 24 November 1897.

== History ==
The library was opened on 24 November 1897 after the site was donated by Alleyn’s College (see Dulwich Estate). The library opened with a stock of 10,152 books.
