= The Halsteads =

Early concrete house in London, England

- Interactive map of the The Halsteads area

General information
- Type: Residential
- Location: London, England
- Coordinates: 51°27′33″N 0°16′24″W
- Completed: 1868

Design and construction
- Architect: Arthur Blomfield

Listed Building – Grade II
- Official name: The Halsteads
- Designated: 25 June 1983
- Reference no.: 1080820

The Halsteads is a Victorian Grade II listed house that stands on Fife Road in East Sheen. It was one of the first houses in England built from concrete.

== History and description ==
The building was built in 1868 by Arthur Blomfield, who also designed The Cottage at 53–55 Christ Church Road nearby in 1863, where he lived for five years. The house is notable for its early use of concrete, with concrete pioneer Joseph Tall involved in its construction, with his patented concrete-shuttering method employed. It has been claimed that the building is the first known architect designed concrete house.

== See also ==
- 549 Lordship Lane
