= George Finch (architect) =

British architect

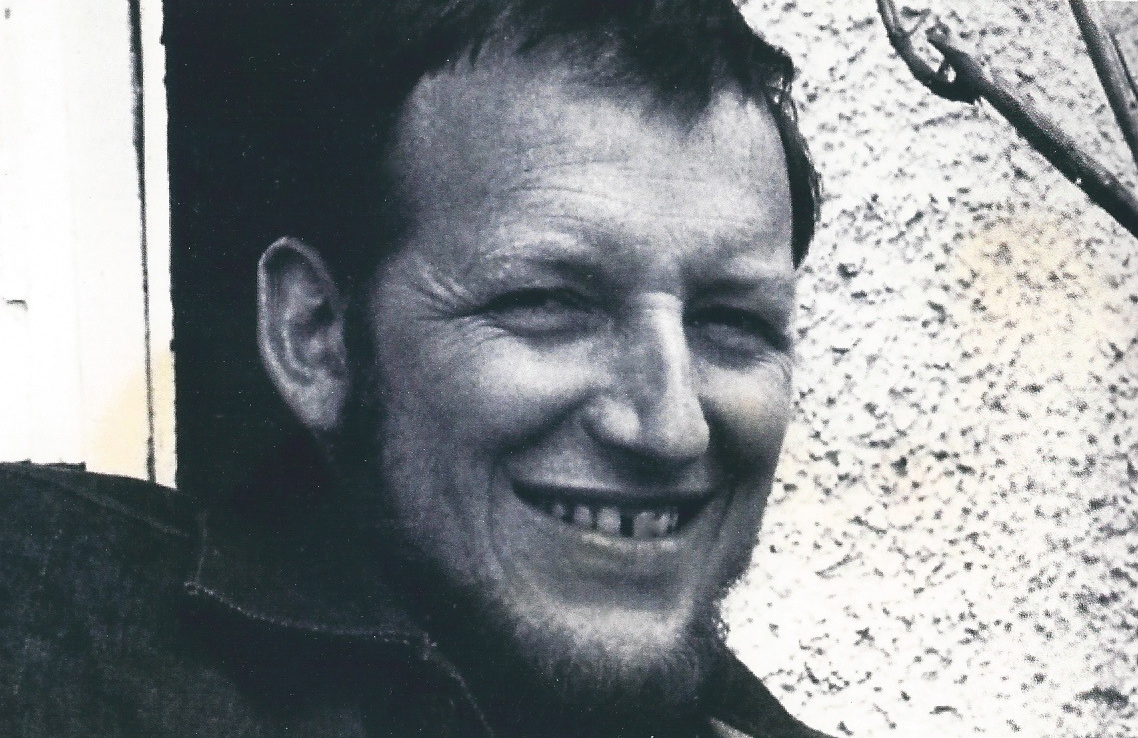
- Born: 8 October 1930; Tottenham, London, U.K.
- Died: 13 February 2013 (aged 82); Winchester, U.K.
- Occupation: Architect
- Spouse: Brenda Vicary (divorced)
- Partner: Kate Macintosh
- Children: Alison Finch, Emma Finch, Sarah Finch, Adam Finch, Jonny Finch, Sean Macintosh
- Buildings: Lambeth Towers, Cotton Gardens, Brixton Recreational Centre

George Finch (8 October 1930 – 13 February 2013) was a British architect. He was a committed socialist who believed architecture had the power to transform the lives of post-war Londoners. Finch's ideals drove his passion for designing social housing, civic and environmental buildings for everyday people built to the highest building standards.

== Biography ==
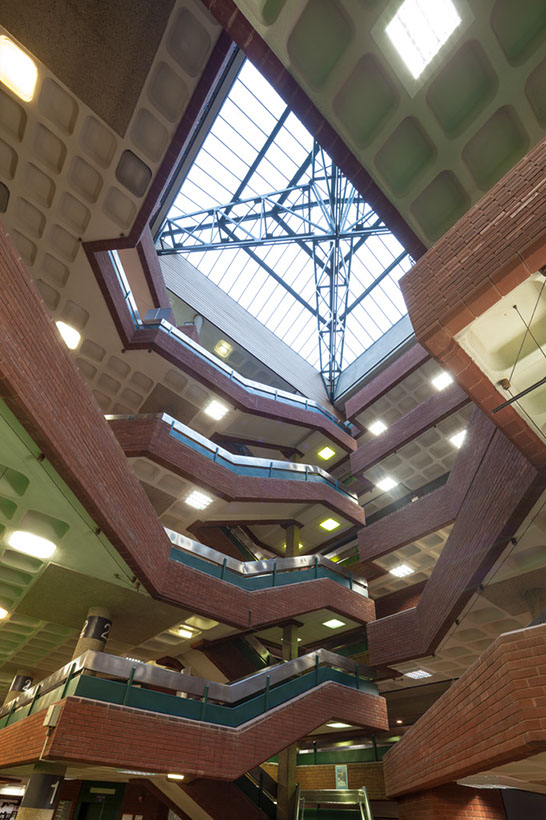
Brixton Recreation Centre interior

Finch was born in Tottenham, the son of a milkman. During WWII, he and his sister, Shirley, were evacuated to Saffron Walden, Essex, where he attended Newport Free Grammar School. Finch then studied architecture, at North London Polytechnic (now London Metropolitan University), moving in 1950 to the Architectural Association School of Architecture. He graduated in 1955 from a year that included Neave Brown, Kenneth Frampton, Patrick Hodgkinson, William Gillitt and Roy Stout.

Finch then joined the London County Council Architects Department, under Leslie Martin, where his designs exemplified Mixed Development – the dominant ideology for housing in the 1950s.

In his reworking of a scheme for Spring Walk, Stepney, he used space freed up at the base of the ten-storey blocks to build flats for the elderly and family houses. These were the earliest two-storey terraced houses to be built by the London County Council and were unique in central London at the time. Finch also introduced sculptural expression into the blocks and added roof gardens to the upper flats.

This was followed by work on Suffolk Estate in Haggerston (1963), an early low-rise, high-density scheme, again with a mixture of houses as well as flats.

When the London Boroughs were granted responsibility for housing in 1964, Edward "Ted" Hollamby, who was chief architect to Lambeth, invited Finch to join the new Architect's Department and, working with structural engineer Edmund Happold, then of Ove Arup, he produced some of the work for which he will be best remembered.

"The London County Council Housing Division was tackling exactly the issues I was interested in so I applied and was interviewed by Oliver Cox, (part of the Alton East design team). It was a great learning period for me as I could go around visiting the different groups and talk about different ideas."

These were the days of Government insistence on industrialised system building. The absence of large vacant sites led Lambeth to adopt a policy of surgical interventions. Working under Hollamby, George Finch pioneered an architecture that created slim point blocks inserted on tight sites but always with communal provision at the base.

"In this way rather than just an exercise in building prefabricated dwellings we were able to expand the potential to include not only other dwelling types to suit different living styles (and remember these were all council dwellings at subsidised rents) but also various facilities that enriched the overall sense of community."

=== Lambeth Towers (designed in 1964, approved in 1965, completed in 1972) ===
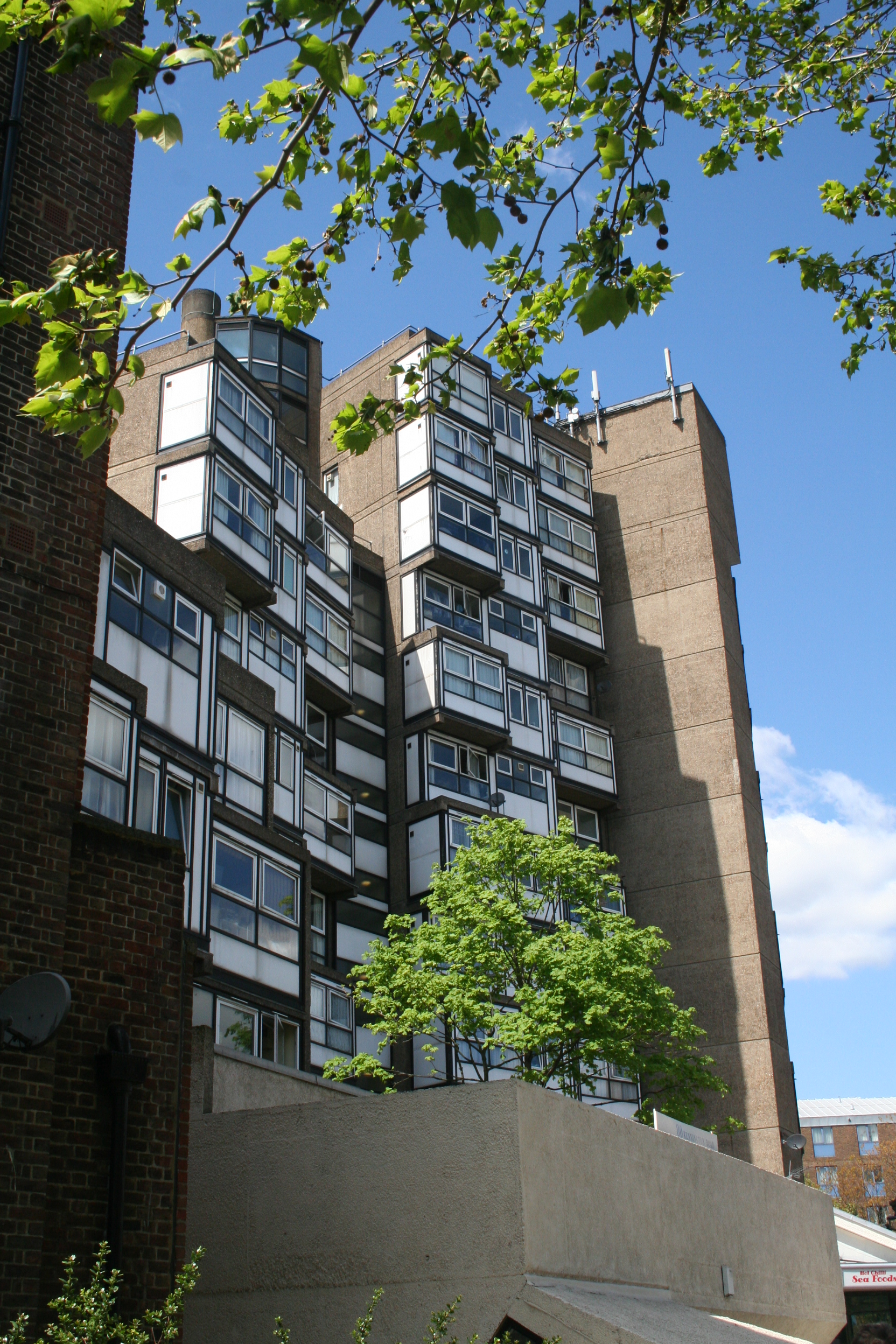
Lambeth Towers

Built on a site opposite the Imperial War Museum, Lambeth Towers is considered by many to be Finch's masterpiece. Flats over ten stories provided affordable, high quality housing, set over a doctor's surgery and a lunch club for the elderly. The ingenious section of stacked maisonettes gives each dwelling dual aspect and its own balcony. Each flat was individually articulated within a cranked concrete frame that maximised the tight site, creating a strong, square patterning.

The building remains.

=== Cotton Gardens 1966 (completed 1968) ===
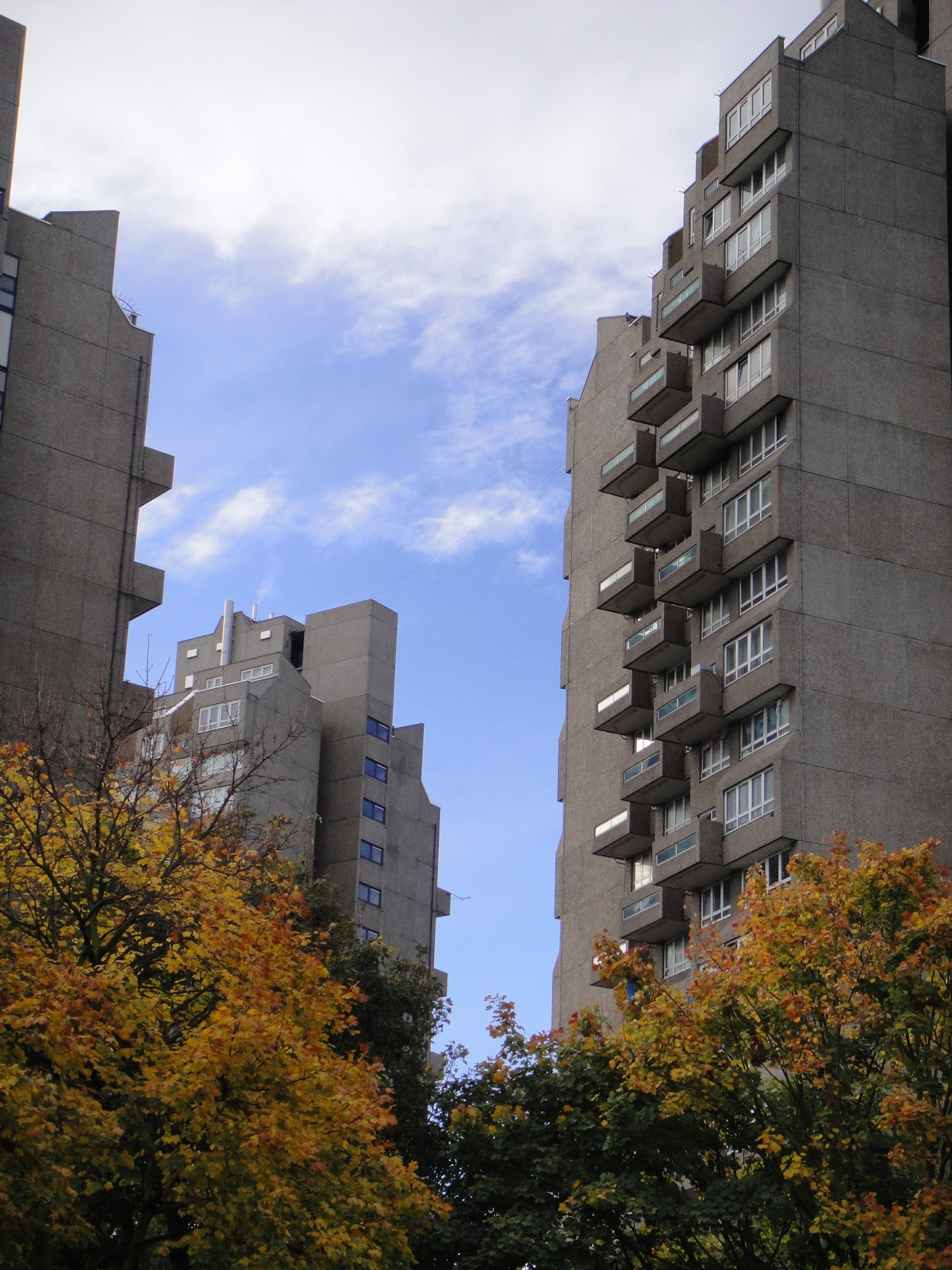
Cotton Gardens

Finch's design for these heavily articulated towers remain exemplars when many tower blocks of the period have since been demolished. Finch described the irregular grouping of craggy blocks as "dancing around." The scheme encompassed two-storey terraced houses with gardens and single occupancy dwellings for the elderly with maisonettes above, either side of a planted space. There was also a rehabilitation centre for the disabled, a community centre, a doctor's surgery and a launderette. Five towers of a similar or the same design can be found within walking distance of Stockwell Tube station, the closest a group of three to the South West of the station, all of which have since been painted white/cream. A further white/cream tower is located to the North West on Larkhall Lane, while a final tower in its original finish is located to the North East of the station on South Island Place.

=== Brixton Recreation Centre 1971 (completed 1985) ===
Finch's last design for Lambeth was the iconic Brixton Recreation Centre. Designed in 1971 as the centrepiece of a proposed radical redevelopment for a new Brixton on raised walkways over a motorway, the recreation centre and the attached International House were the part of the scheme that was realised when the rest of the scheme was abandoned in 1973. The recreation centre took 12 years to complete after construction commenced in 1973 due to protracted political, financial and labour problems. Finch created an active atrium linking the swimming pools, gymnasia, climbing wall and other facilities. Recently threatened with closure, in January 2013, council leader Lib Peck affirmed that "The Rec is a treasured, landmark building and is part of what makes Brixton so special and unique", promising that it would be retained.

In October 2016 the Brixton Recreation Centre was given Grade II listed status for its special architectural and historic interest. Historic England recognised it as "one of George Finch’s most important buildings and illustrating his socialist principles".

== Later Work ==
Finch left Lambeth when the Brixton Recreation Centre received planning and financial approval and, a keen thespian and set designer, he formed a partnership with theatre architect Roderick Ham. As a result of the 1970s recession, only the Derby Playhouse and Wolsey Theatre, in Ipswich, and work carried out to the Theatre Royal, York and Theatre Royal, Lincoln were realised, while later schemes including Westminster Pier and Riverside Studios in Fulham, developed in partnership with Will Alsop and John Lyall, proved abortive.

From 1973 until 1978 Finch was Head of Design in the School of Architecture at Thames Polytechnic (now Greenwich University). Later, joining Bob Giles' Architects Workshop, he was reunited with Ted Hollamby who by then had been appointed Chief Architect to the London Docklands Development Corporation. Hollamby commissioned Architects Workshop to produce a development plan for Canary Wharf. Their adopted plan followed a "remarkable" brief that allowed no buildings above 5 storeys. It was, however, a short lived and largely unrecorded endeavour, swept away by another, very different vision for Docklands when the LDDC accepted an America consortium's offer "they couldn't refuse", to build the mega-city of today. Moving to Hampshire, Finch worked as a consultant for Hampshire County Architects Department, led by Sir Colin Stansfield Smith. Here he advised on the rehabilitation of the county's older schools and added library and drama facilities. He also worked on several historic buildings, adapting All Saints, Lewes, in East Sussex, into a theatre; a school in Dulwich, London, into housing; and remodelling Chelsea Town Hall.

Still active well into his 70s, Finch formed a professional practice with his then partner, Kate Macintosh. In 2005 Finch Macintosh designed the Weston Adventure Playground, Southampton, a charity lottery project. He delighted in contributing to the community through this popular Centre that won a prestigious RIBA Award. His work was recently re-assessed in Tom Cordell's documentary film 'Utopia London'. The appreciation of his work by colleagues, critics and most of all the occupants of his buildings did a lot to relieve the pain he felt at seeing the commodification of the housing he had designed to dignify the lives of everyone. Following a Docomomo tour of his Wates blocks, Spring 2012, George wrote, "Those I met were all enthusiastic about their homes – eager to show me around and thanking me for what I had done".

== Personal life ==
In 1955 Finch married Brenda Vicary with whom he had five children, Alison, Emma, Sarah, Adam and Jonny. The marriage ended in separation and later divorce. In the late 60s he met Architect Kate Macintosh with whom he had a son Sean and remained until the end of his life.

== Works ==
- Wates Blocks:- Building Design, September 1967 Utopia London, film.
- Lambeth Towers:- RIBA Journal July 1965, Utopia London, film.
- Brixton Recreation Centre:- Utopia London, film. www.brixtonblog.con/tag/brixton-recreation-centre
- Derby Playhouse:- Architectural Review October 1976.
- Chelsea Town Hall conversion:- Building, 1 August 1980
- Park Community School:- Building sup. Refurbishment 10 May 1991
