= Dawson's Heights =

Housing estate in East Dulwich, London, United Kingdom

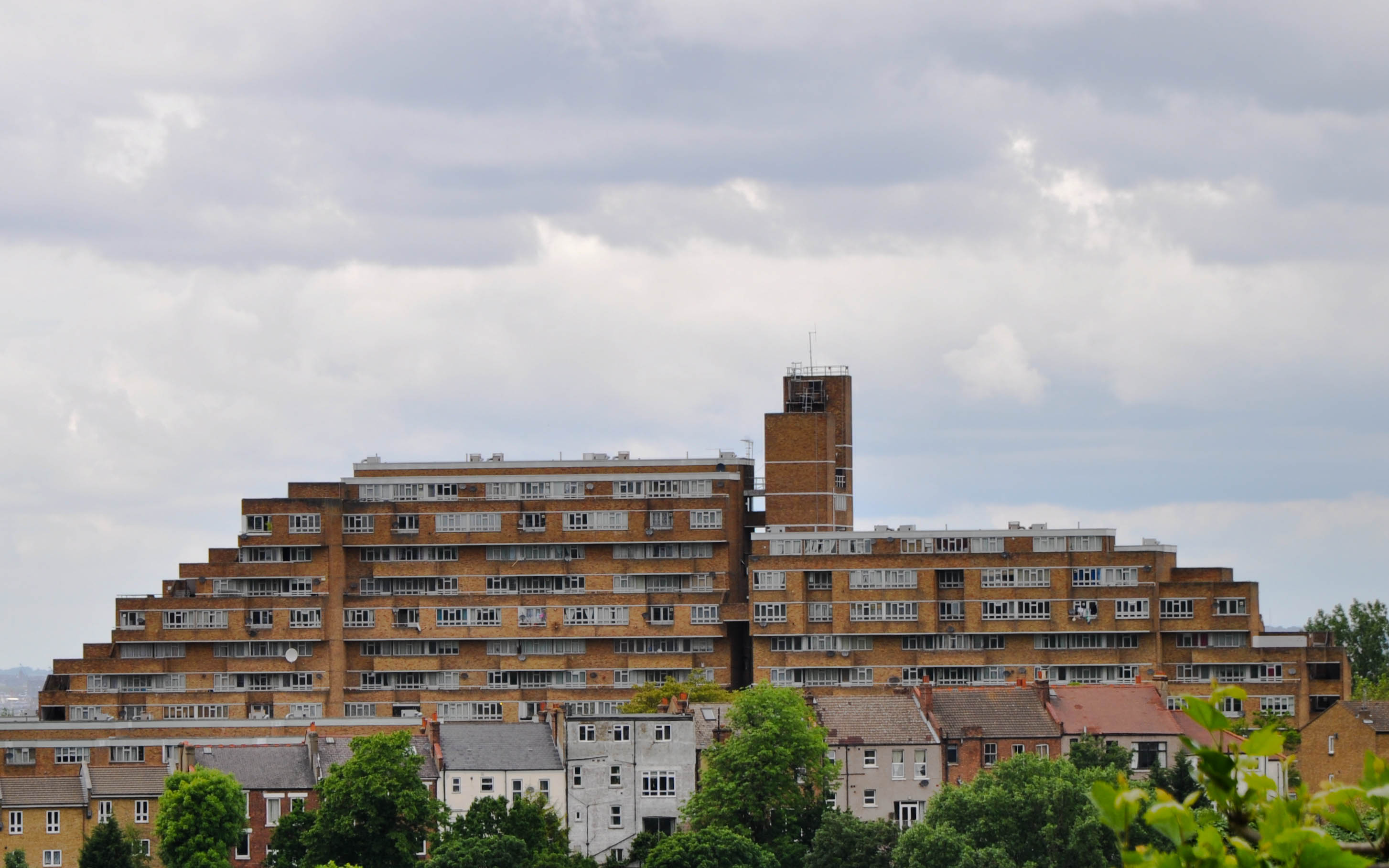
- Interactive map of Dawson's Heights

General information
- Location: East Dulwich, London Borough of Southwark, UK
- Coordinates: 51°26′50″N 0°04′02″W
- Status: Completed
- No. of units: 298

Construction
- Constructed: 1964–1972
- Architect: Kate Macintosh

Dawson's Heights (also known as Dawson Heights) is a large social housing estate in East Dulwich, London Borough of Southwark, London.

It was designed by Kate Macintosh and built in between 1964 and 1972. The estate is built on top of a spoil tip from the creation of a nearby railway line.

Dawson's Heights consists of two blocks of flats: Bredinghurst to the south and Ladlands to the north. Composed of 298 flats distributed over 12 floors, it compromises 112 one-bed flats, 75 two-bed, 81 three-bed and 28 four-bed, all split-level dual aspect maisonettes. There is also a small nature reserve to the north of the buildings, managed by the Dawson's Hill Trust.

It has a modernist style, reminiscent of a ziggurat. The purpose of this design was to ensure that two thirds of the flats had views in both directions, including towards central London. English Heritage described the estate as having "a striking and original massing that possesses evocative associations with ancient cities and Italian hill towns".

Despite its unique and imposing architectural style within the East Dulwich area, and strong recommendation from English Heritage, it was turned down for listing by the Secretary of State in 2012.

== Gallery ==
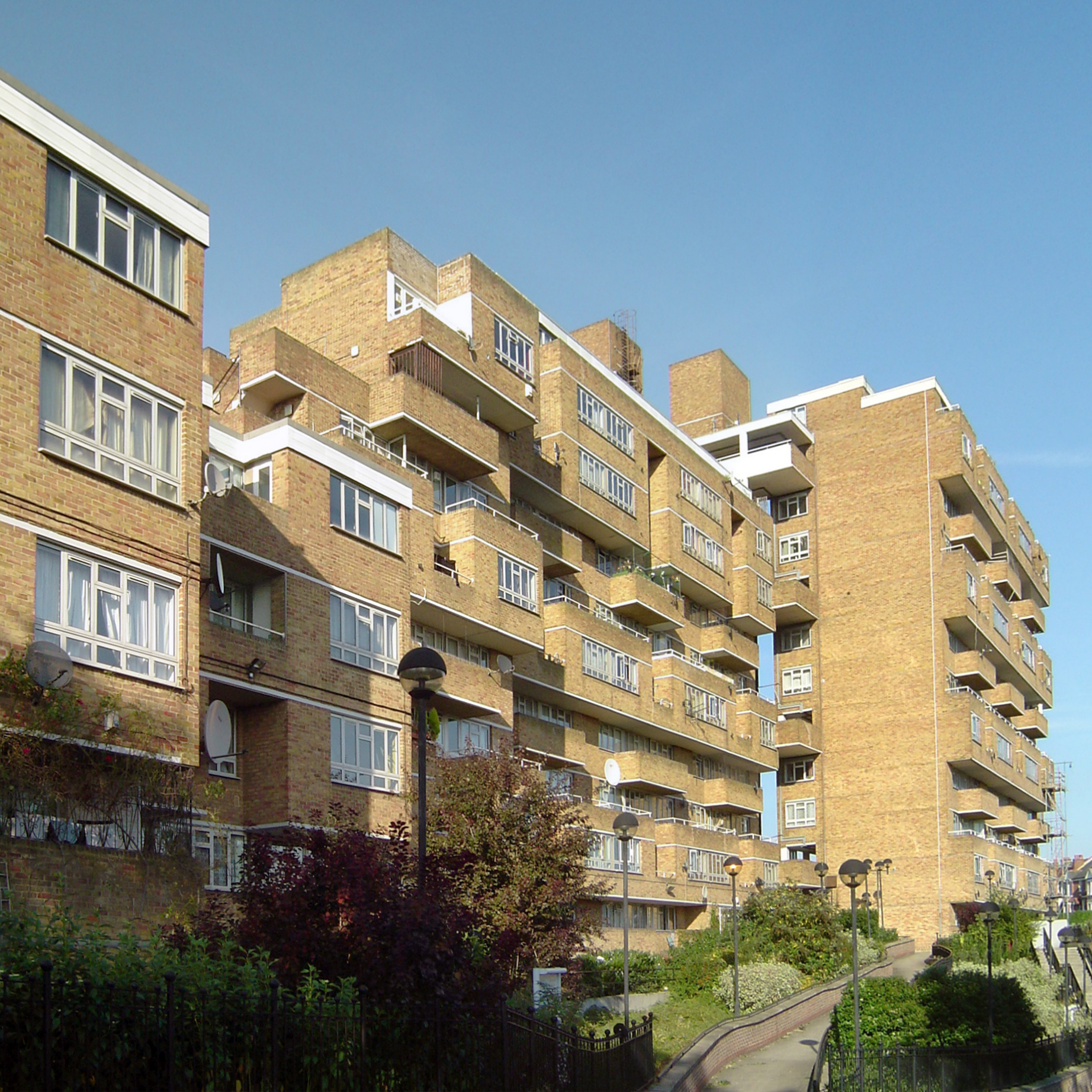
Dawson's Heights from Overhill Road

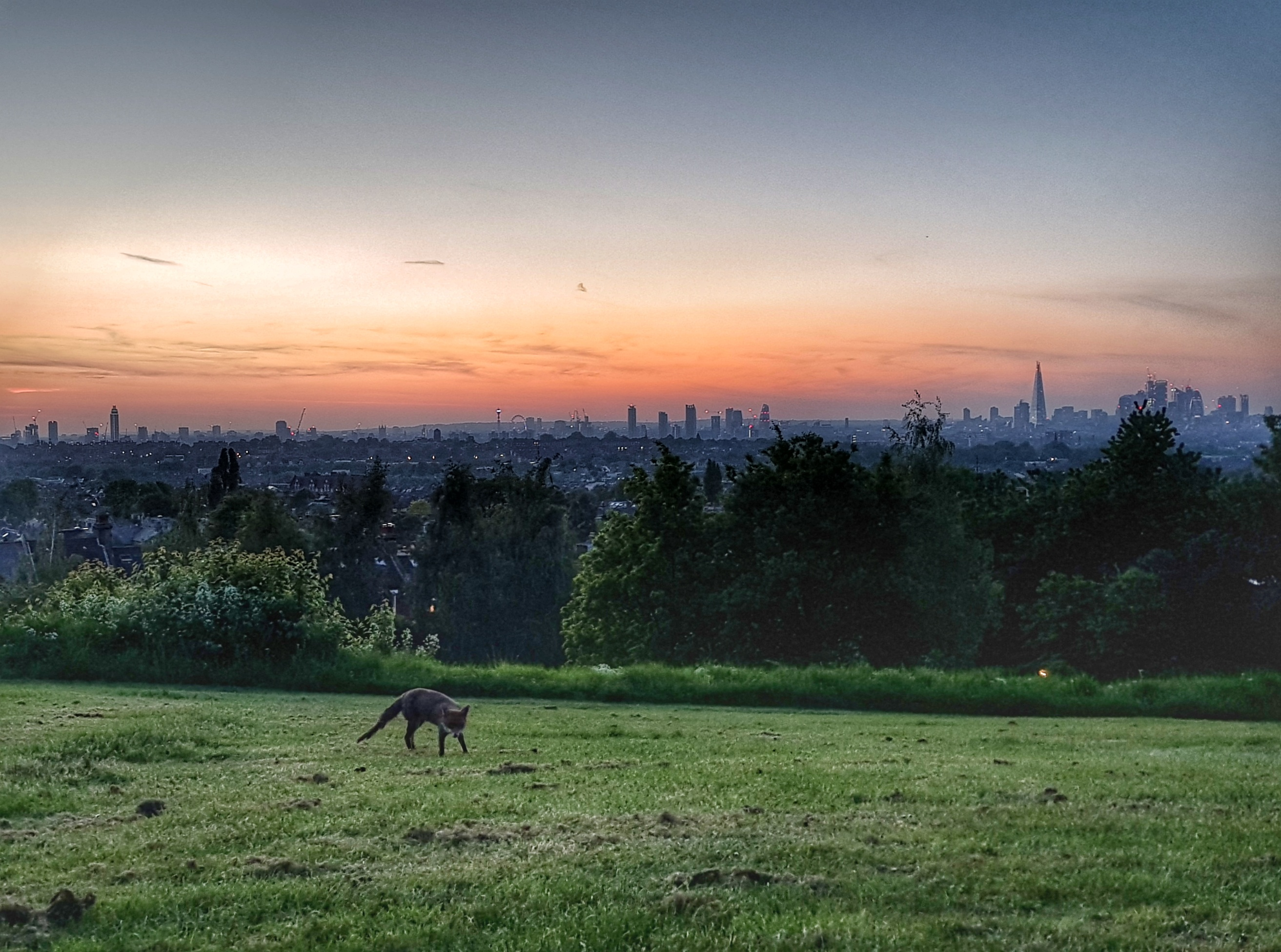
An urban fox in the nature reserve on Dawson's Hill, May 2018

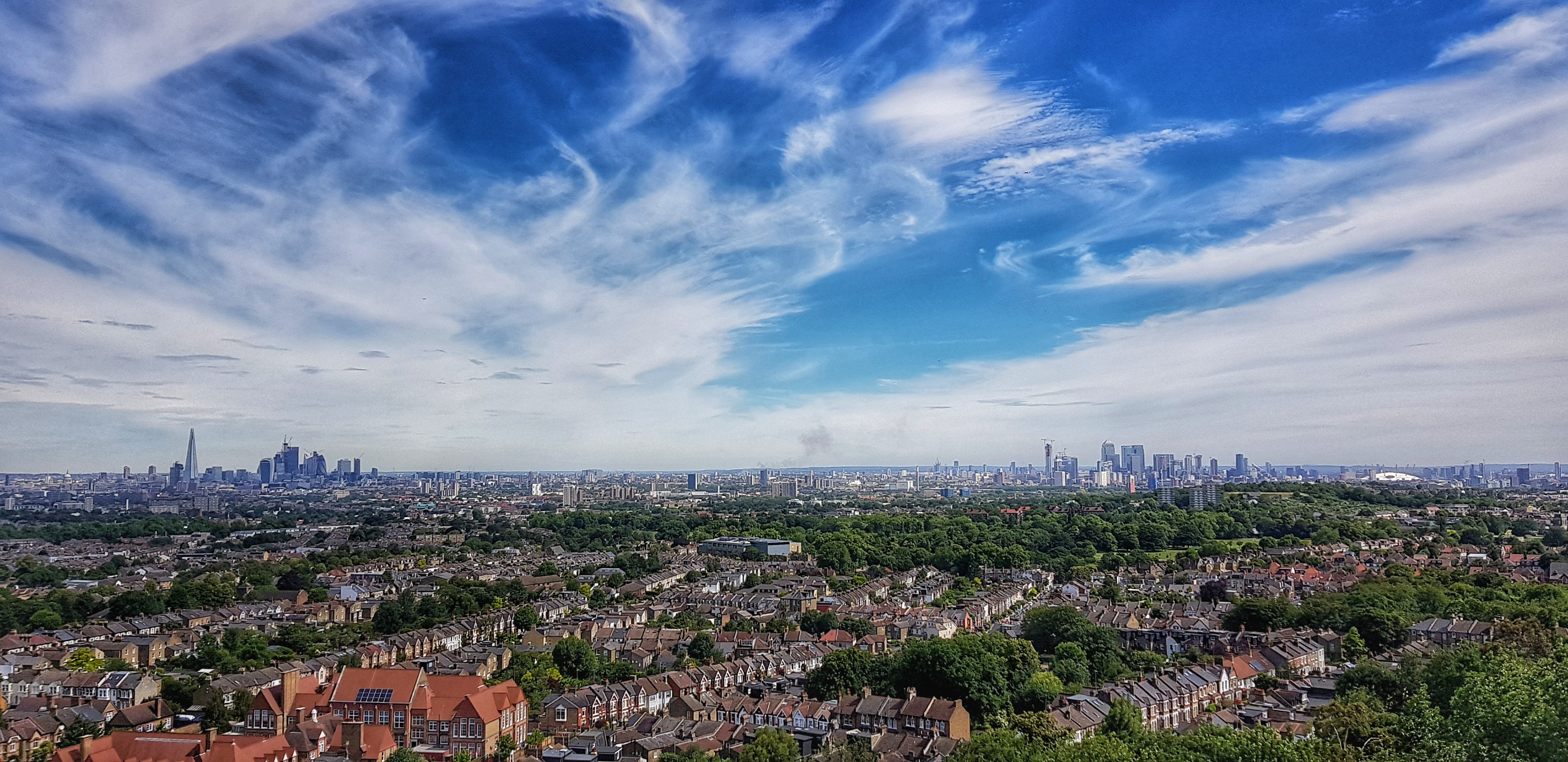
View of Central London from the Ladlands building, June 2018
