= 549 Lordship Lane =

Building in Southwark, London, England

Coordinates: 51°26′34″N 0°04′00″W

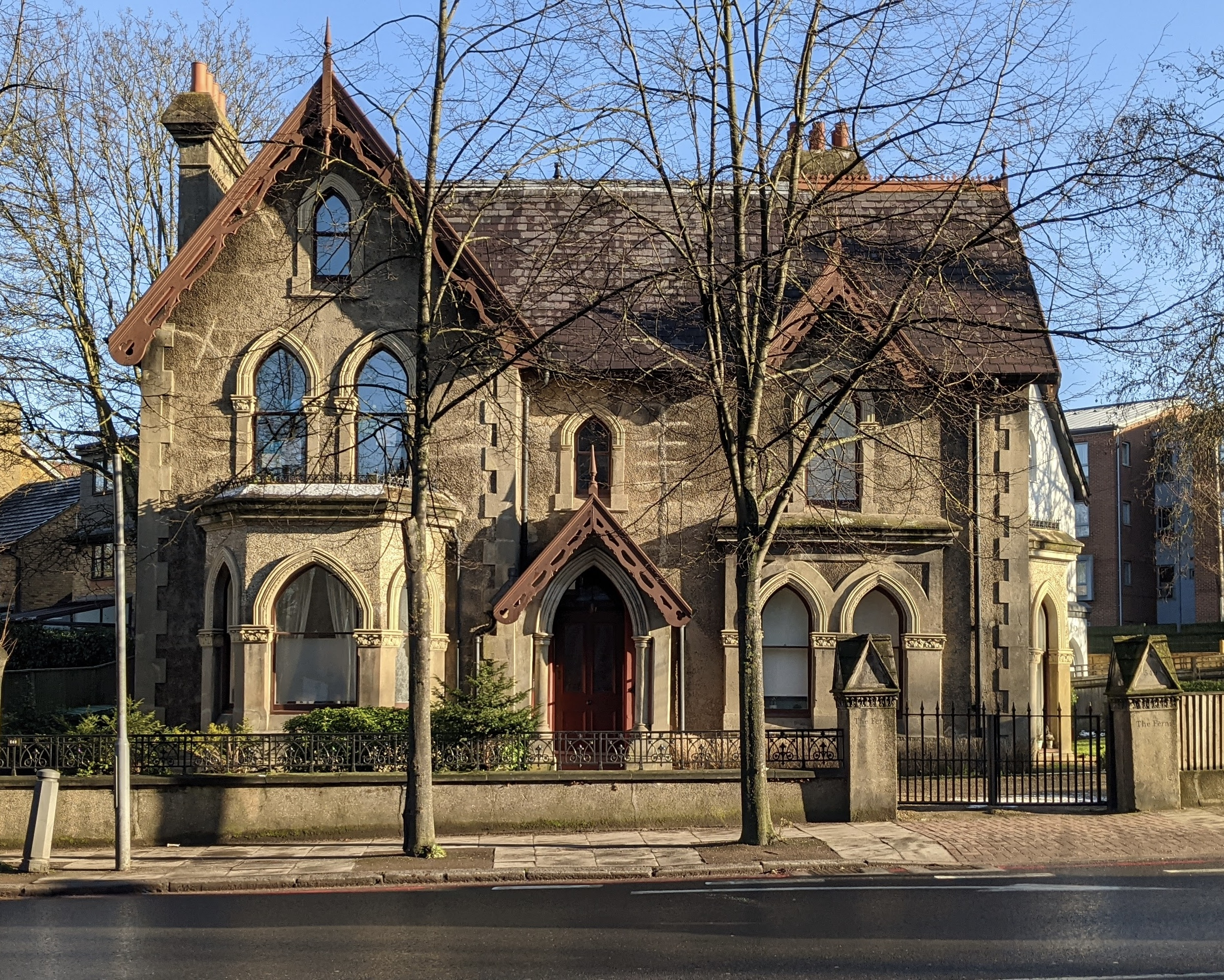
549 Lordship Lane with its concrete gate piers, January 2021,

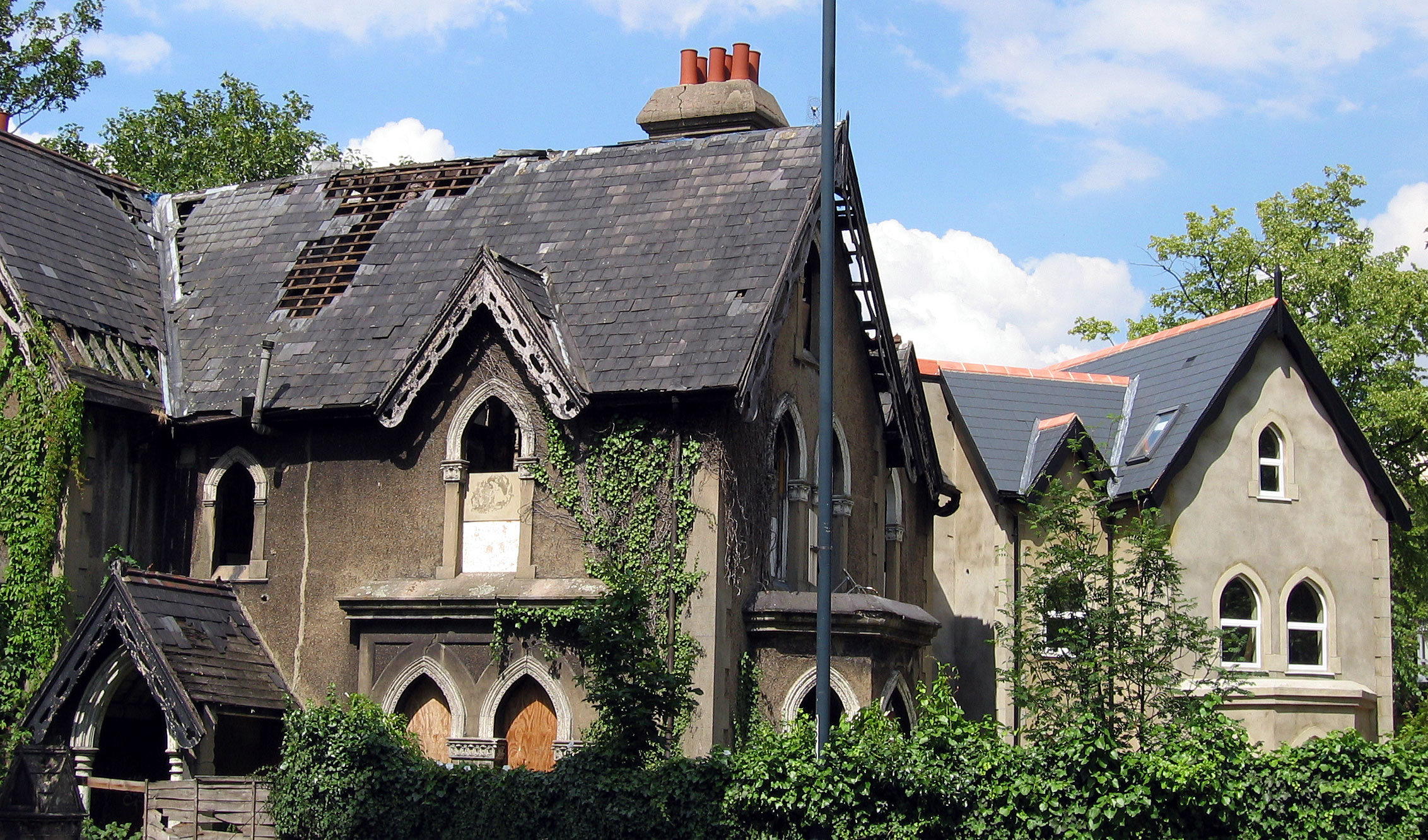
The derelict Concrete House on Lordship Lane, Southwark in 2005, with similar new building behind.

549 Lordship Lane, also known as the Concrete House, is a house on Lordship Lane in East Dulwich, close to the junction with Underhill Road and opposite St Peter's Church. The Gothic Revival house is an early example of a modern domestic dwelling constructed of concrete. It became a Grade II listed building in 1994.

The house may have been designed by Charles Barry Jr. (1823-1900) (son of Sir Charles Barry who worked on the Houses of Parliament), possibly as a rectory or parsonage to accompany his Gothic style St Peter's Church on the opposite other side of Lordship Lane. It was built in 1873 by Charles Drake of the Patent Concrete Building Company, and it may have been his own house. Drake had taken out a patent in 1867 for the use of iron panels for shuttering, in place of the usual timber. The mass concrete construction anticipates modern slip form methods, with bare concrete around the windows resembling stone, and surface patterning in other areas resembling pebbledash, with an effect similar to béton brut. It is believed that the house is the only surviving example in England.

It was made from Portland cement with "burnt ballast" (clay) aggregate, without reinforcement, faced with mortar and render. The house has an L-shape plan, with two storeys and an attic. The ground floor has canted bays on the two principal façades, to the south west and south east, with pointed arched windows, and gabled porch in the return angle on the south west elevation. There are further pointed arched windows on the first floor, and square headed windows on the north west and north east elevations. The steeply pitched slate roof has projecting gables, topped by three large concrete chimneys.

The house was sold three years after it was completed, and passed through the hands of many owners. It suffered bomb damage in the Second World War, but survived plans to replace it in the 1950s with a petrol filling station or residential flats, or in the 1970s with a nursery, or in the 1980s with a nursing home. It fell into disrepair and was vacant from the 1980s, with water ingress through holes in the roof causing significant damage to the interior, including the loss of the original decorative cornices and ceiling roses.

The owner was granted planning permission to construct a similar building behind, on condition that the Concrete House was restored, but while the new building was completed, the restoration was not done, and the house became increasingly dilapidated. Southwark London Borough Council rejected several applications for permission to demolish the building. It was listed on English Heritage's Buildings At Risk register from 1994 to 2013.

The house was acquired by Southwark Council in 2009 under a compulsory purchase order. It was restored with assistance from the Heritage of London Trust, the Architectural Heritage Fund, and the London Development Agency, and converted from a single dwelling into five flats in shared ownership, with a long lease granted to Hexagon Housing Association. Prince Richard, Duke of Gloucester, reopened the restored building on 13 June 2013.

The restoration won the Angel Commendation award from English Heritage in 2013, and an award for building conservation from the Royal Institution of Chartered Surveyors in 2014.

== See also ==
- The Halsteads, another early concrete house in London
