= Adam Finch (film editor) =

British film editor

Adam Finch is a British film editor whose work spans drama, documentary and the arts. He is best known as the editor of the surreal mystery film Innocence (directed by Lucile Hadžihalilović), and for his multi-screen editing for filmmaker and installation artist Isaac Julien.

== Background ==
Born in November 1961 in Chelsea, London, Finch is one of five children and son of architect George Finch. Finch studied fine art (film) at Saint Martin's School of Art in the film unit established by artist and filmmaker Malcolm Le Grice, graduating in 1984. While at St Martins he became friends with fellow art student Isaac Julien, beginning an ongoing artistic collaboration.

== Multi-screen editing ==
In 1999 the two worked on The Long Road to Mazatlán, a collaboration between Julien and choreographer Javier de Frutos. A lyrical “fantasia” of ‘amour fou’ in the American south, the film was conceived as a cinematic triptych, shot in part with three laterally mounted cameras and intended to be shown in a gallery as three adjacent synchronised projections.

At the time, there was little precedent for editing synchronised multi-screen drama; the form had lain dormant since 1927 when Abel Gance's experiments with so-called Polyvision in his film Napoléon ran aground. For The Long Road to Mazatlán, Finch and Julien worked on an innovative film form; in his words: "We developed a lexicon and a syntax for that kind of parallel montage". The result was described by the writer David Frankel as "...hardly conventional syntax, yet rhythmic editing creates a sinuous flow". The installation earned Julien a Turner Prize nomination and the film was exhibited at Tate Britain alongside a diptych, Vagabondia, also edited by Finch.

Since then they have developed and expanded these early montage experiments in a body of work spanning more than 20 years and more than 20 films; in Julien's words: "Slowly the multiple screens have become our gateway into a more complete and more immersive kind of environment. Adam and I try to leave our references open-ended and we work at developing their more enigmatic aspects."

In 2010 Finch edited Julien's nine screen drama, Ten Thousand Waves, featuring actress Maggie Cheung. The technical challenges were uncharted, Julien said: "As you can imagine it can pose a considerable challenge to a film editor to work across nine screens." The film was a eulogy to 21 immigrants who died in the 2004 Morecambe bay cockling disaster. Julien wanted to interrupt the complacency of the audience, and to " ... disrupt the narrative flow, drawing attention away from the story and towards the film as a visual experience. One approach was for some screens to go blank at certain points, to force the audience to move and change their perspective. As Finch explains, "We wanted people to move around in space. My job was to choreograph that". The scale of the work also lent itself to a dynamic, sweeping editing style designed to disorientate and engulf the audience. The piece is structured around an overarching spiral architecture which is mirrored in the layout of the screen installation in the gallery. Ten Thousand Waves premiered at the Hayward Gallery in London and was later exhibited at MOMA, New York, who acquired it for their permanent collection.

In 2017 the five screen film Western Union: Small Boats was exhibited at the Royal Academy as part of the Summer Exhibition where it won the Charles Wollaston award for 'Most Distinguished Work'.

== Single screen editing ==
In 2004 Finch edited Innocence by Lucile Hadžihalilović and featuring Marion Cotillard, Sight and Sound wrote of its "… eerie richness of filmic language, including a chilling use of sound"; and in 2021 he cut her new film Earwig featuring Romola Garai.

Finch's documentary credits include, Derek with Tilda Swinton (nominated for the 'Grand Jury World Cinema Documentary Prize' at the Sundance Film Festival) and Leonora: The Lost Surrealist (winner of both the Grierson Award for ‘Best Arts Documentary 2018’ and the RTS Regional Award for ‘Best Specialist Factual 2018’). In April 2021 Finch was nominated for two BAFTA awards including 'Best Factual Editing' for his work on Putin: A Russian Spy Story.
