= East Dulwich =

Area of South East London, England

Coordinates: 51.4620°N 0.0840°W

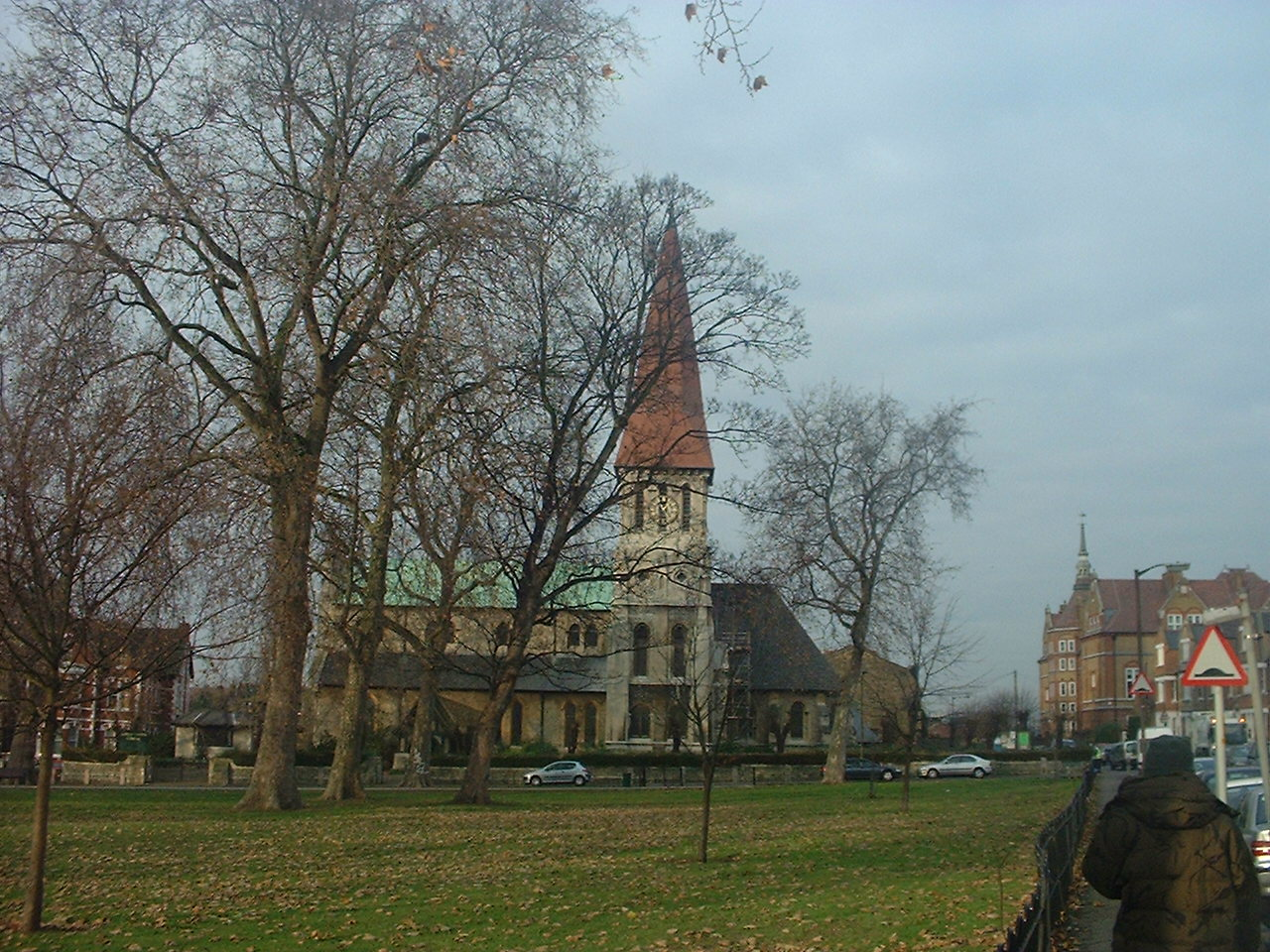
- Goose Green, East Dulwich

- Location within Greater London
- Population: 12,321 (2011 Census. East Dulwich ward)
- OS grid reference: TQ345745
- London borough: Southwark
- Ceremonial county: Greater London
- Region: London
- Country: England
- Sovereign state: United Kingdom
- Post town: LONDON
- Postcode district: SE22
- Dialling code: 020
- Police: Metropolitan
- Fire: London
- Ambulance: London
- UK Parliament: Dulwich and West Norwood
- London Assembly: Lambeth and Southwark

East Dulwich is an area of South East London, England in the London Borough of Southwark. It forms the eastern part of Dulwich, with Peckham to the east and Camberwell to the north. East Dulwich is home to the Dog Kennel Hill statue. This South London suburb was first developed in the nineteenth century on land owned by the College of God's Gift.

It was originally part of the much larger, historic parish of Camberwell, which later became the Metropolitan Borough of Camberwell, and included Camberwell, Peckham, Dulwich, Nunhead, and other London districts.

== History ==
=== Saxon Dulwich ===
The earliest record of East Dulwich comes from 967 when Edgar the Peaceful granted Dilwihs to a thane named Earl Aelfheah. Dilwihs meant "meadow where the dill grew". At the time East Dulwich was likely just a hamlet or group of small farms centered around what is today known as Goose Green.

=== Medieval East Dulwich ===
In 1066 King William I conquered England, and Dulwich became the property of the new Norman dynasty after taking the land from King Harold II of England, ending the Anglo-Saxon Kingdom. During the Middle Ages many new roads were likely constructed nearby, such as what is today known as Lordship Lane which became the boundary separating Dulwich Manor from Friern Manor, and which was constructed during the reign of King Richard I of England. In 1340 the hamlet of "Est Dilewissh" was sold to John Leverich by William Mabuhs.

=== Tudor Dulwich ===
In 1538 with the establishment of the Church of England Dulwich was no longer the property of Bermondsey Abbey, which was dissolved in 1537. In 1544 Dulwich was granted to goldsmith Thomas Calton for £609 by Henry VIII making the area no longer property of the crown. Nearby Dulwich, a vast forest known as the Great North Wood, began to be used by local colliers and vast portions of the woodland were cut down in order to build ships.

=== Stuart East Dulwich ===
During the Stuart era a fresh water spring was found on the edge of Dulwich Wood on the corner of Lordship Lane and College Road. Francis Cox built a Public House which attracted travellers to the well built at the site of the spring. In 1705 Cox constructed a new road, linking his business to the towns of Croydon and Beckenham to the south, today the road is a pathway known as Cox's Walk.

=== Georgian Dulwich ===
In John Rocques’ 1761 map of the cities of London and Westminster, small farms and buildings occupy the modern location of East Dulwich at Goose Green; the modern Grove Vale road is referred to as Dog Kennel Lane. South of Goose Green a settlement referred to as Fryum Farm is present, this probably represents the modern Frein Farm. In 1805 Dulwich Common was enclosed and in 1826 East Dulwich Chapel was built at the start of Lordship Lane opposite Goose Green.

=== Victorian Dulwich ===
In 1851 Dulwich's population was recorded at 1,632 and in 1863 the London, Chatham and Dover Railway was built. In 1865 St John's Church built amidst green fields and in 1868 East Dulwich railway station opened as Champion Hill Station, in the same year Old village green is bought for public use. In 1871 Lordship Lane station was built near modern-day Dulwich Wood.

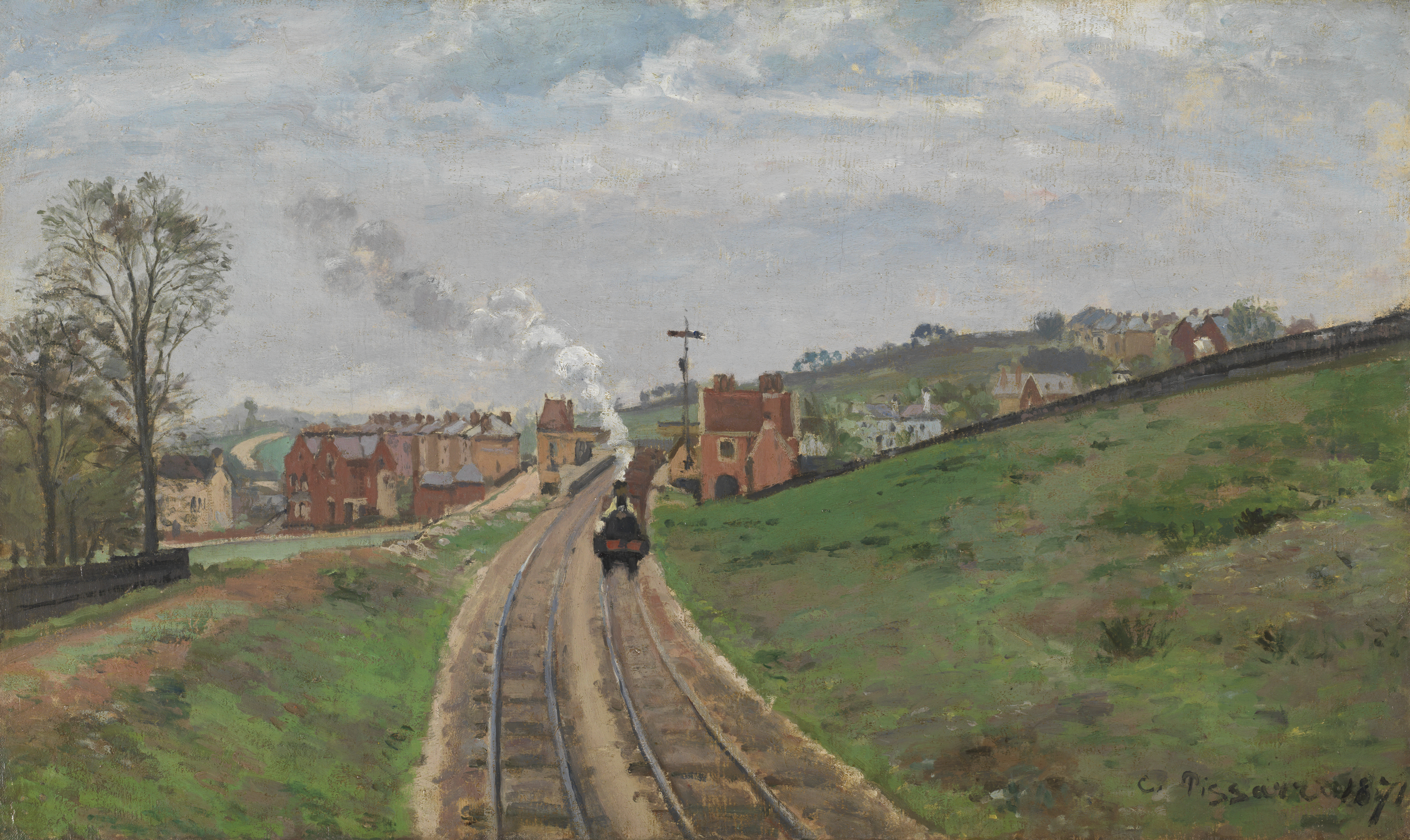
Camille Pissarro, Lordship Lane railway station, East Dulwich, 1871

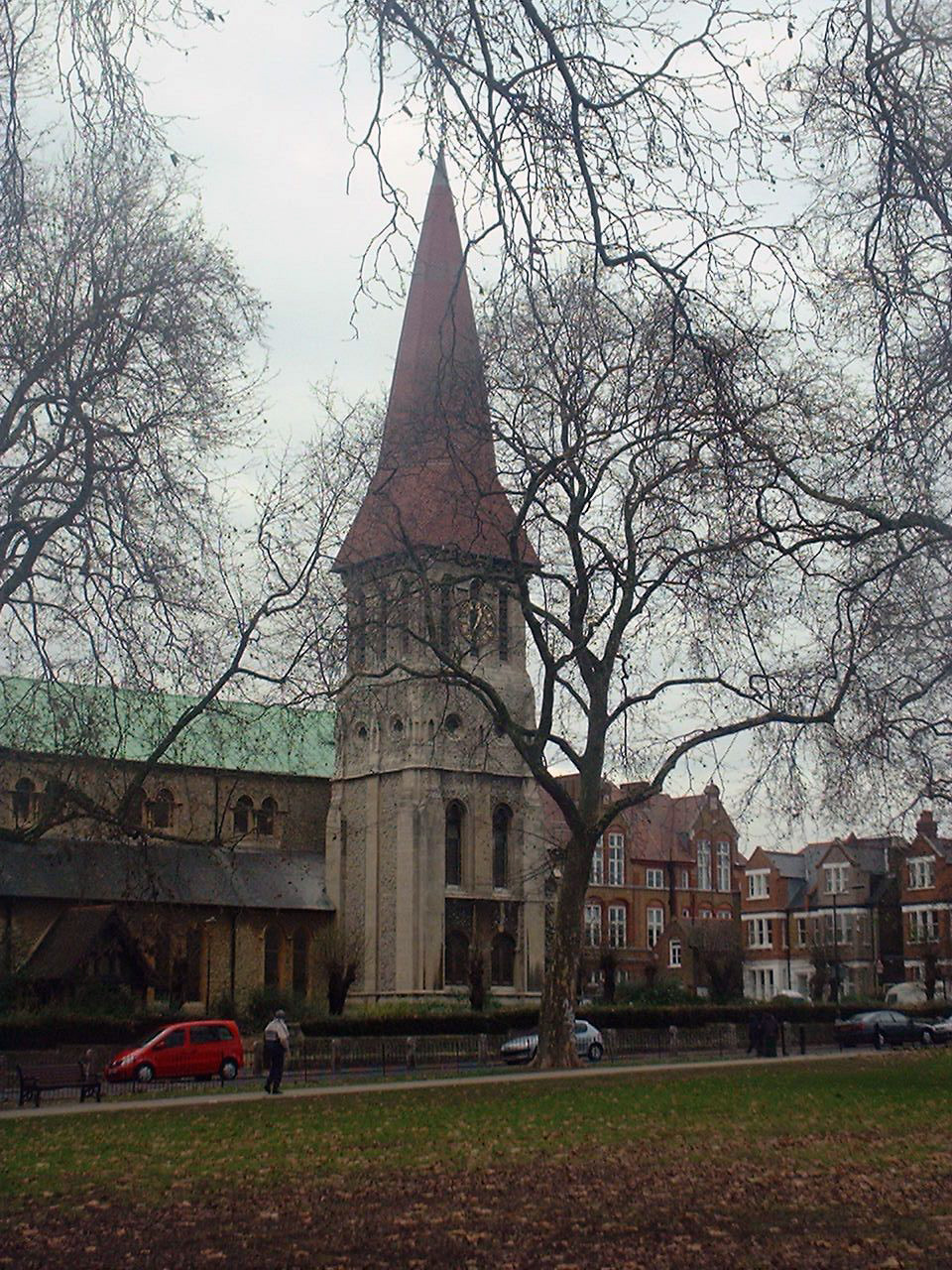
St John the Evangelist church at Goose Green

Between 1871 and 1881 over 5,000 houses were built in East Dulwich as the small hamlet became part of the rapidly expanding London suburbs. The Upper Middle class migrated to the area building "Villas" (large houses with bespoke gardens) nearby, many of which had tennis courts. In 1872 Adys Road School was built of Adys road replacing the St Johns vicaridge and Forest Oak Villa (both of which can be observed on 1860s ordance survey maps). In 1874 St Peter's Church was built and in 1877 Emmanuel Congregational Church opened on Barry Road. In 1882 Heber Road School opened and in 1885 horse-drawn trams arrived providing transport into london.

In 1887 Dulwich Hospital opened and in 1890 Dulwich Grove Congregational Church opened on Melbourne Grove. In the early 1890s Dulwich Park and Peckham Rye Park opened to the public as the area became more urban and densely populated, the old villas disappeared being replaced by smaller houses. In 1892 Dulwich Public Baths opened on East Dulwich Road and in 1893 Dulwich Fire Station opened on Lordship Lane (closed 1947 after war damage). Dulwich Library also opened in the 1890s.

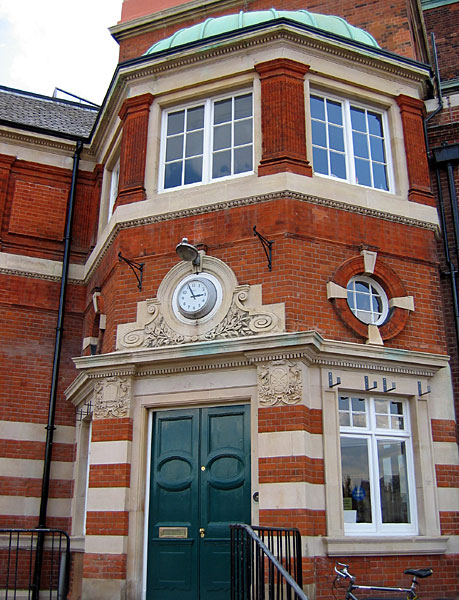
Dulwich Library

1897 - Dulwich Library opened.

Goose Green in snow

1897 - Enid Blyton was born on Lordship Lane.

=== Modern East Dulwich ===
It is a residential area which has undergone gentrification in recent years. There is a shopping area along Lordship Lane which, in addition to several independent shops, has a variety of restaurants, cafes, and wine bars, in addition to a butcher, cheeseshop, and fishmonger. On Saturdays there is a small market on North Cross Road with antiques, crafts and specialist food stalls. Some of the public houses in the area have been converted to gastropubs. The area is also known for its high quality of public education, including Heber and Harris primary schools.

==== Dateline ====
1900 - Part of the Metropolitan Borough of Camberwell. Grove Vale School opened.

1901 - Dulwich's Population: 10,376

1902 - Imperial Hall opened in Grove Vale.

1906 - Horse-drawn trams were replaced by electrical ones. The route ran Dog Kennel Hill, Lordship Lane and East Dulwich Road.

1912 - Dulwich Hamlet FC moved to Dog Kennel Hill. Aquarius Golf Club opened.

1923 - Imperial Hall became Pavilion. Grove Tavern rebuilt.

1931 - New Dulwich Hamlet FC stadium opened.

1935 - St Thomas More Catholic Church officially named.

1938 - East Dulwich Odeon opened.

1940s - World War II: the Blitz and the V1 & V-2 rocket flying bombs caused widespread damage to East Dulwich.

1952 - End of electric trams.

1965 - Became part of new London Borough of Southwark.

1972 - East Dulwich Odeon closed. Later became London House.

1973 - Dawson's Heights by Kate Macintosh

1977 - East Dulwich Police Station opened.

1980 - AC/DC singer Bon Scott died in a car parked outside of an East Dulwich house.

1994 - St John's & St Clements school moved to Adys Road.

1998 - Commemorative blue plaque added to 36 Forest Hill Road, birthplace of Boris Karloff (William Henry Pratt)

2003 - London House (old East Dulwich Odeon) demolished.

2015 - East Dulwich Picturehouse opened.

== Geography ==
East Dulwich area map.

=== Dulwich Plough ===
One area of East Dulwich is called Dulwich the Plough. This was named after a pub, "The Plough" which had been there since 1830. The pub was taken over by Bass Taverns pub chain and changed its name in 1996 to the Goose and Granite. Despite the efforts of a "Save Dulwich Plough" campaign the new name was kept for almost ten years. The name reverted to The Plough in 2005.

Dulwich Library, which opened on 24 November 1897 is nearby.

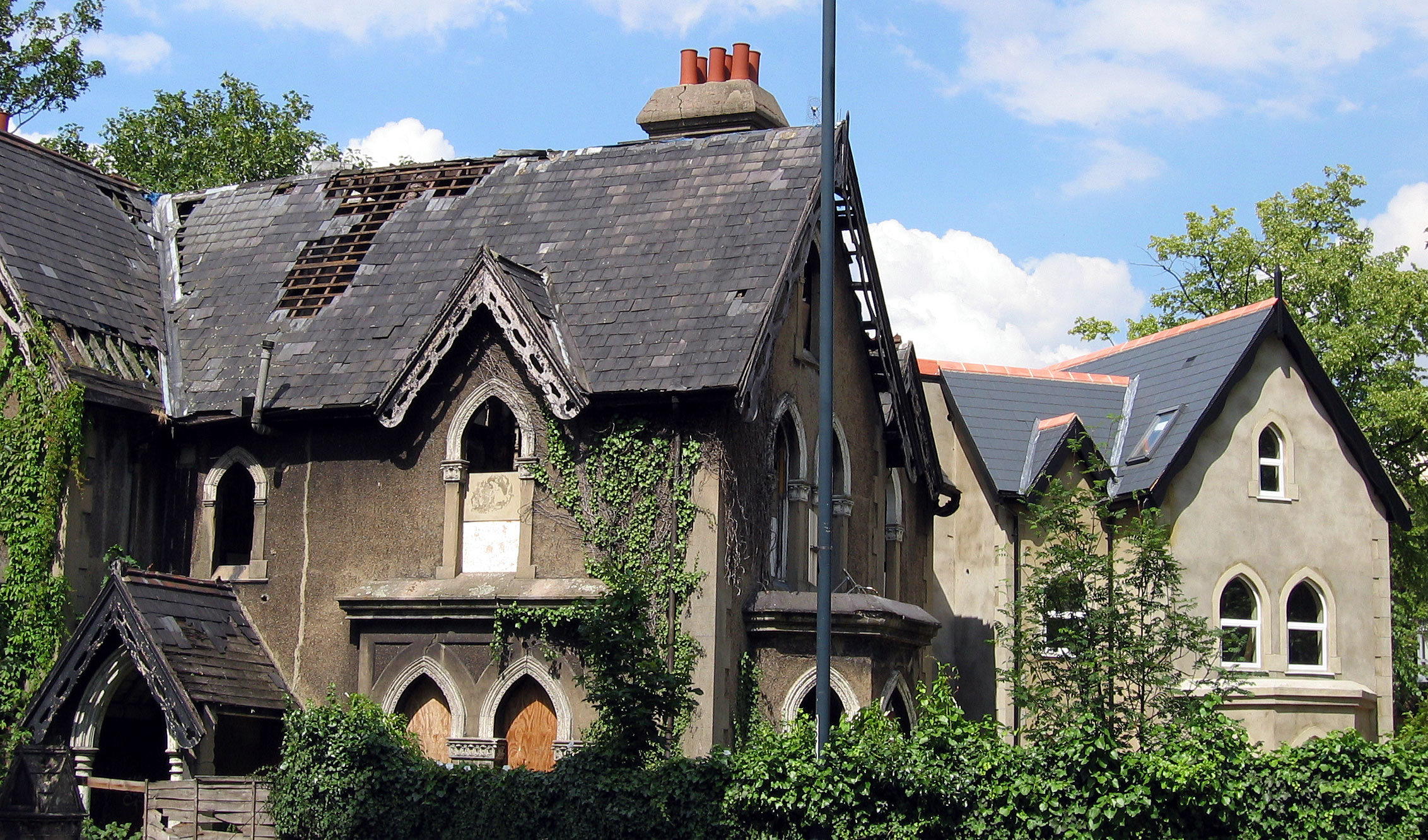
The Concrete House on Lordship Lane

=== 549 Lordship Lane: the "Concrete House" ===
One of the most architecturally interesting buildings in the area is at 549 Lordship Lane. The so-called "Concrete House" is a former derelict grade II listed building, now restored and back in use, and is an example of 19th-century concrete house. It is believed that it is the only surviving example in England.

The Concrete House was built in 1873 by Charles Drake of the Patent Concrete Building Company. In 1867 the builder had patented the use of iron panels for shuttering rather than timber.

It was on the Heritage at Risk Register from 1994 to 2013 when it was removed following its successful repair and conversion. Having fallen vacant in the 1980s and developing serious structural problems, it has been fully restored and converted to five flats in shared ownership. It then won an award from English Heritage, the Angel Commendation.

== Local government ==
East Dulwich is currently represented by Labour MP Ellie Reeves, who won the newly created seat of Lewisham West and East Dulwich in the 2024 General Election.

General election 2024: Lewisham West and East Dulwich
Party	Candidate	Votes	%	±%
Labour	Ellie Reeves	27,406	59.1	–7.1
Green	Callum Fowler	9,009	19.4	+12.1
Liberal Democrats	Josh Matthews	3,558	7.7	–2.2
Conservative	Christine Wallace	3,477	7.5	–7.0
Reform	Marian Newton	2,234	4.8	+3.0
Workers Party	Gwenton Sloley	427	0.9	N/A
CPA	Katherine Hortense	303	0.7	+0.2
Majority		18,397	39.7	–11.8
Turnout		46,414	66.2	+0.1
Registered electors		70,099		
Labour hold		Swing	▼9.6	

== Sport and leisure ==
East Dulwich is home to the non-league football club Dulwich Hamlet, who play at Champion Hill.

== Transport ==
The area is served by East Dulwich railway station, for Southern train services between London Bridge and local south London destinations.

== See also ==
- List of people from Southwark
- Southwark London Borough Council
