= Kate Macintosh =

Scottish architect

- Born: Catherine Ailsa Macintosh; 1937 (age 88–89); Edinburgh, Scotland
- Education: Edinburgh College of Art
- Occupation: Architect
- Partner: George Finch
- Awards: Royal Institute of British Architects award, Member of the Order of the British Empire (MBE)
- Practice: London Borough of Southwark, London Borough of Lambeth

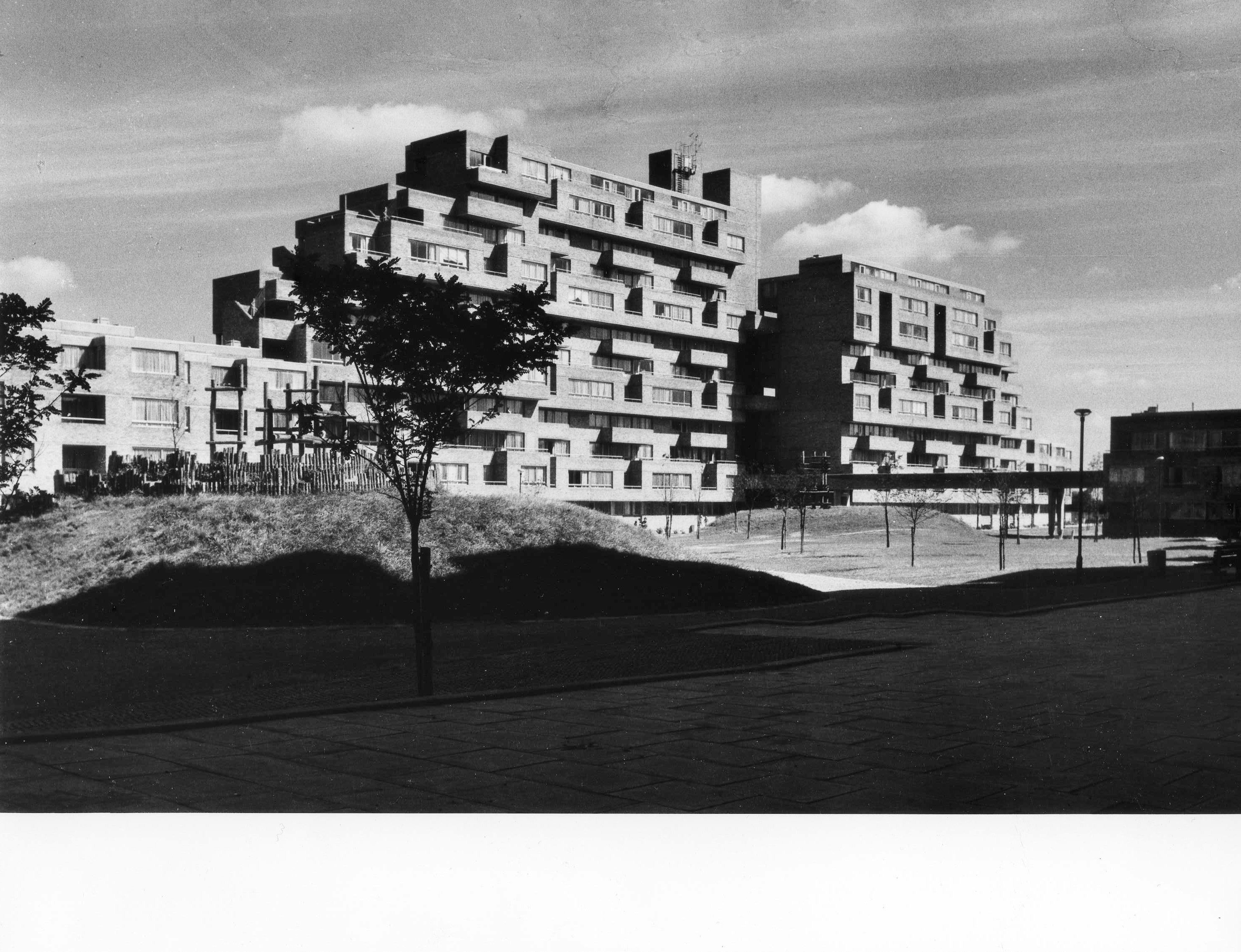
Dawson's Heights in 1973, viewed from Overhill Rd

Catherine Ailsa "Kate" Macintosh MBE (born 1937) is a Scottish architect known for her work for local authorities. She designed Dawson's Heights in Southwark and 269 Leigham Court Road, a Grade II listed building in Lambeth.

== Career ==
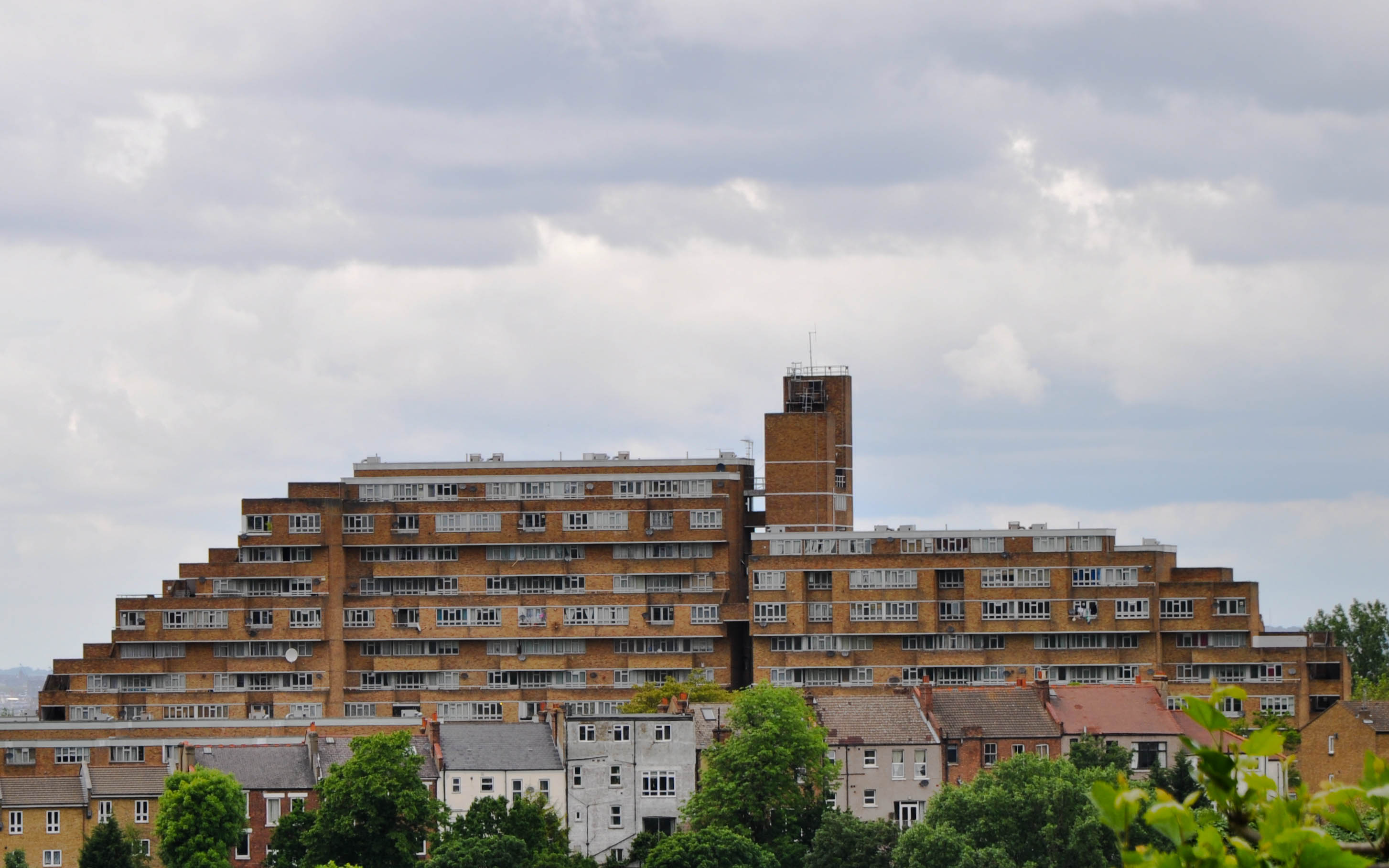
Dawson's Heights - "one of the most remarkable housing developments ..."

Macintosh was raised in Edinburgh. She studied at the Edinburgh College of Art, now part of the University of Edinburgh. After graduating in 1961, she spent a year studying in Warsaw on a scholarship from the British Council, then worked in Stockholm, Copenhagen and Helsinki before returning to the United Kingdom in 1964. Macintosh briefly worked under Sir Denys Lasdun on early designs for the National Theatre in London. She left the project soon afterwards in 1965 to work for local authorities in Southwark, designing public buildings. There, she designed the Dawson's Heights social housing estate in Dulwich, a project which was described in The Observer as "one of the most remarkable housing developments in the country".

In 1968, Macintosh left Southwark to work for the Lambeth architecture department, where she designed a sheltered housing facility for the elderly, 269 Leigham Court Road. The complex was described at the time as "the London Borough of Lambeth's first wholly metric dwellings", while The Guardian dubbed it decades later "a modernist gem".

She went on to work for the counties of East Sussex and Hampshire, working on public buildings that included sheltered housing, schools and fire services. These included Halton Hastings, Fire Training HQ Maresfield (East Sussex) and Rushmoor Fire Station (Hampshire). Later, she went on to work in private practice with her life-partner and fellow architect, George Finch.

Macintosh won a Royal Institute of British Architects award in 2005 for her design of a playground in Weston, Southampton, designed in partnership with George Finch, within the practice, Finch Macintosh Architects.

In 2012, the Twentieth Century Society campaigned for Dawson's Heights to be designated as a listed building, but the recommendation was unsuccessful. A similar campaign in 2015 to have 269 Leigham Court Road listed by Historic England as a Grade II building was successful. In June 2016, it was renamed Macintosh Court in honour of its architect.
