= Lordship Lane, Southwark =

Street in East Dulwich, London

Coordinates: 51.4515°N 0.0765°W

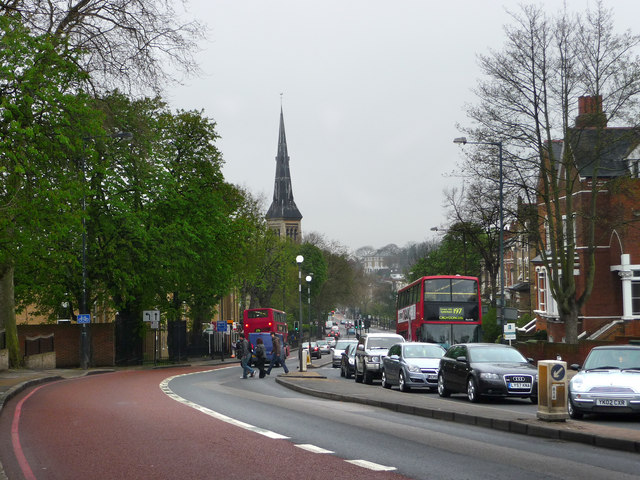
Lordship Lane

Lordship Lane is an ancient thoroughfare, once rural, in East Dulwich, a suburb of the London Borough of Southwark in southeast London, England, and forms part of the A2216.

It runs north–south from Goose Green to Wood Vale. The Lordship Lane and North Cross Road area now has a wide selection of bars, restaurants and specialist retailers for the 'foodie' market.

== Points of interest ==
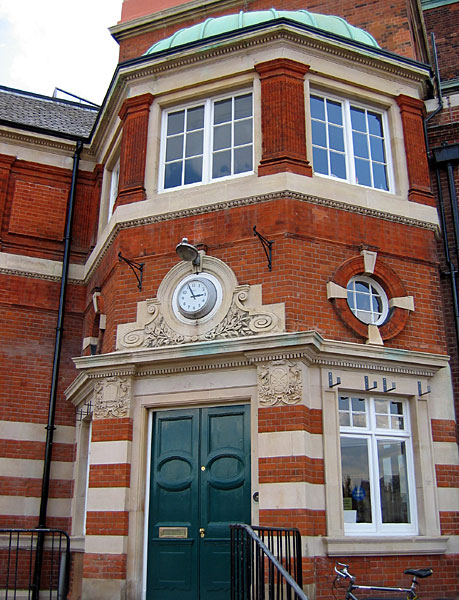
Dulwich Library.

The architecturally meritorious Dulwich Library, which opened on 24 November 1897, is on the lane. Lordship Lane is also home of the unusual listed building, the so-called "Concrete House".

The children's author, Enid Blyton was born on 11 August 1897 above a shop in Lordship Lane. A Southwark Blue Plaque was placed there in 2003 (above 352–356 Lordship Lane, near the library).

== The Concrete House ==
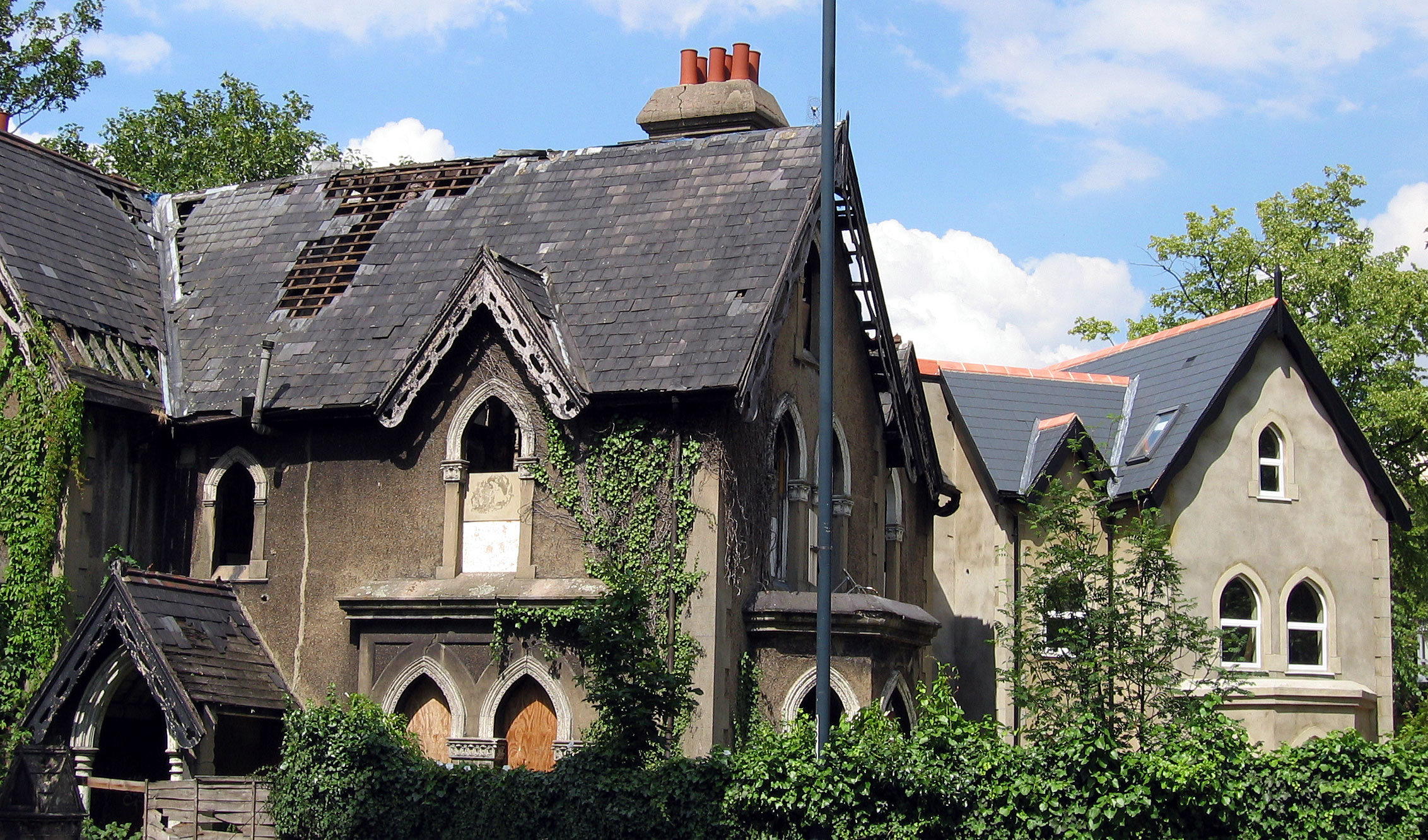
The derelict Concrete House on Lordship Lane.

One of the most architecturally interesting buildings in the area is at 549 Lordship Lane. The so-called "Concrete House" grade II listed building and is an example of a 19th-century concrete house. It was built in 1873 by Charles Drake of the Patent Concrete Building Company. In 1867, the builder had patented the use of iron panels for shuttering rather than timber. It is listed on English Heritage's Buildings At Risk register. Southwark Council refused permission for its demolition.

Derelict for many years it has now been restored with the help of the Heritage of London Trust into 5 flats, to be managed by Hexagon Housing Association. The Duke of Gloucester opened the completed building on 13 June 2013.

== History of the lane ==
Lordship Lane is East Dulwich's oldest street. It is an ancient thoroughfare that significantly predates the late 19th century developments. The area was transformed from fields and market gardens to Victorian suburbs in the period 1865–1885. The tram line that once served Lordship Lane is long gone.

== Lordship Lane station ==
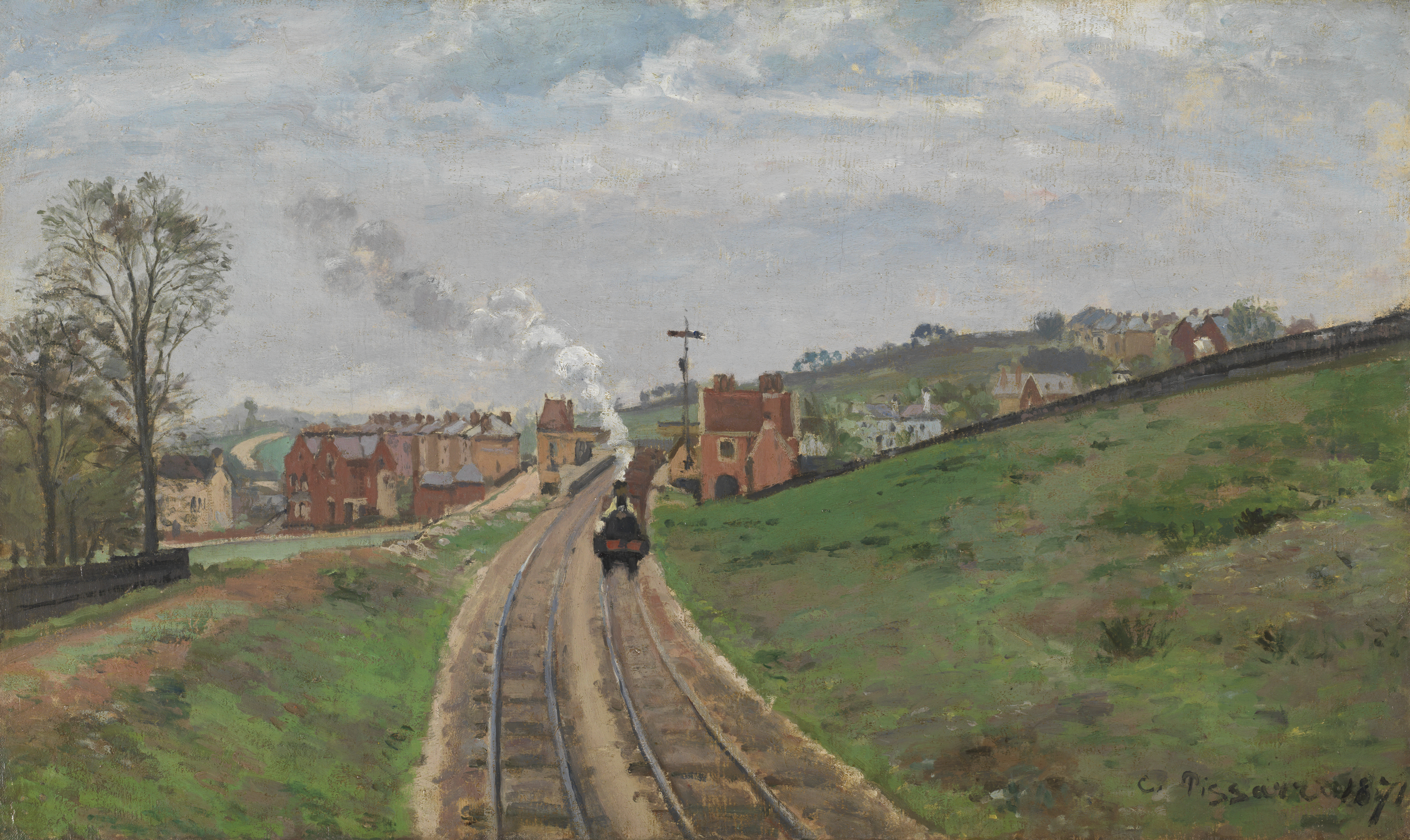
Lordship Lane Station, Dulwich, an intermediate station on the Crystal Palace and South London Junction Railway, a LCDR branch line in London, 1871 by Camille Pissarro.

Lordship Lane station was a station on the Crystal Palace and South London Junction Railway, built by the London, Chatham and Dover Railway in 1865, which closed along with the rest of the line on 20 September 1954. The railway crossed London Road (just beyond the southern end of Lordship Lane) on a bridge and the station was just to the south-west of the road. The site is now housing: the London Borough of Southwark's Sydenham Hill Estate.

This locality is also the subject of Lordship Lane Station, Dulwich, an 1871 painting by Camille Pissarro, which now hangs at the Courtauld Institute of Art in London.

== Gallery of shops and sites ==
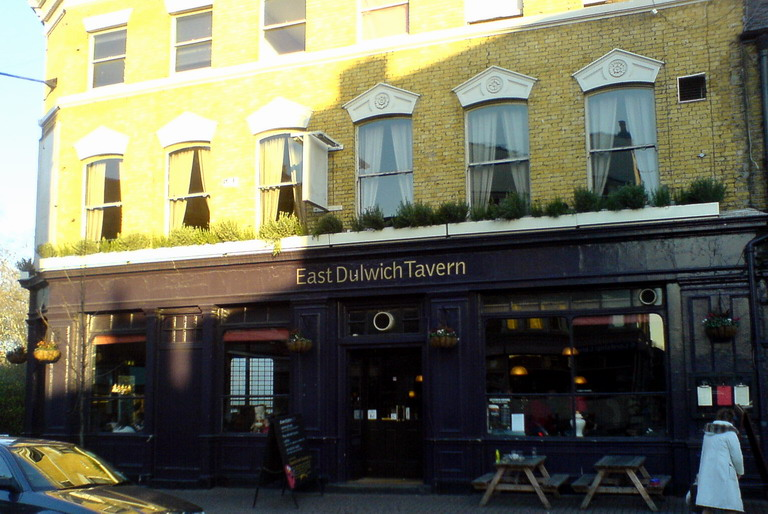
East Dulwich Tavern, 1 Lordship Lane

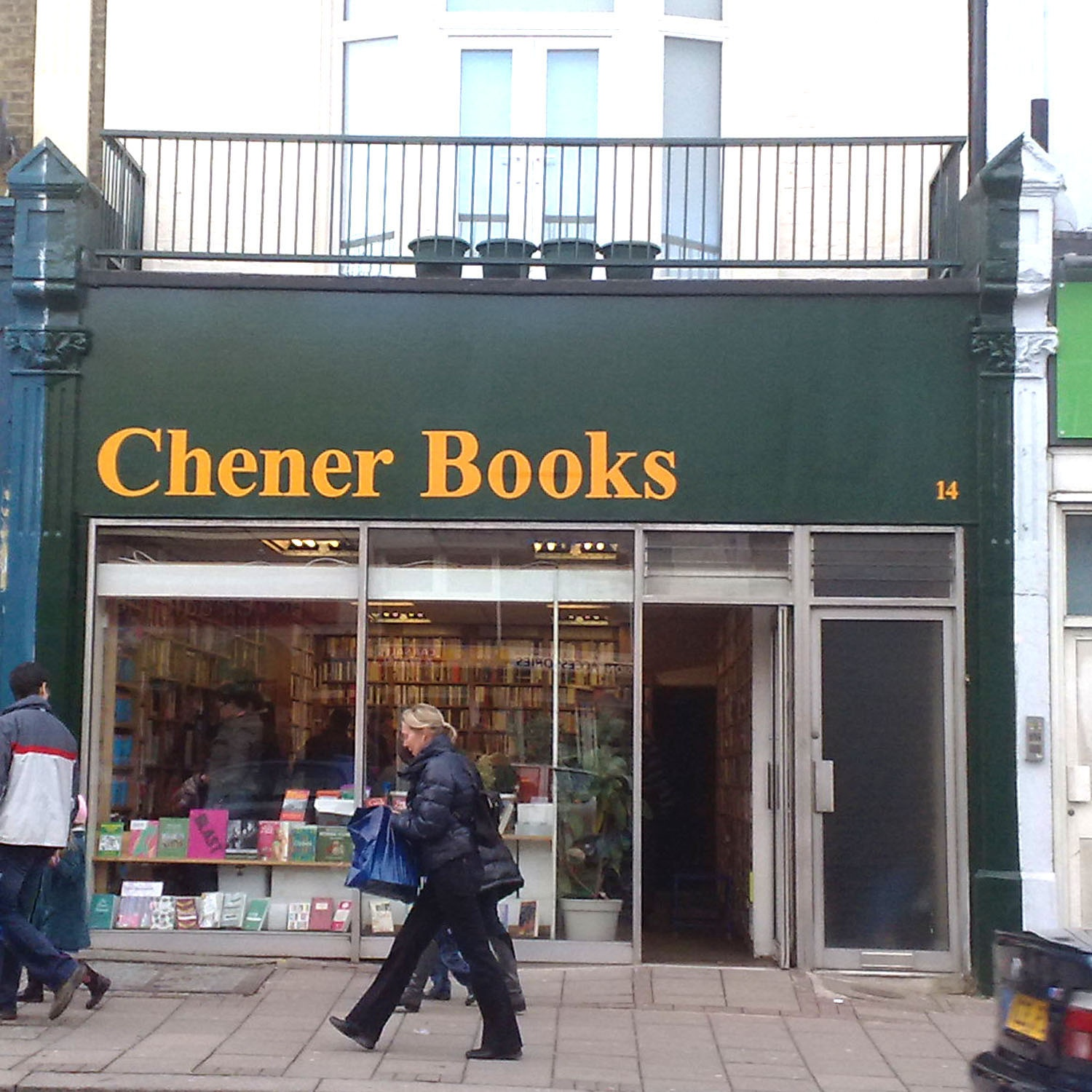
Chener Books, 14 Lordship Lane

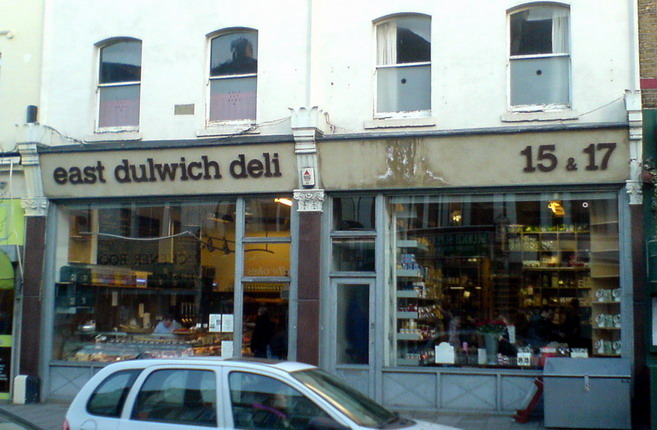
East Dulwich Deli, closed, 15–17 Lordship Lane

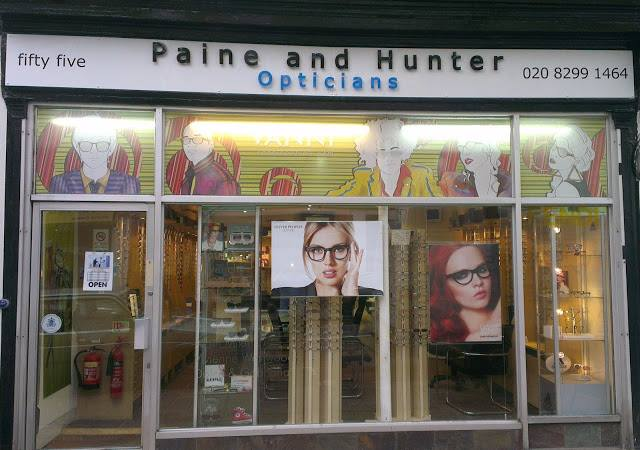
Paine and Hunter Opticians, 55 Lordship Lane

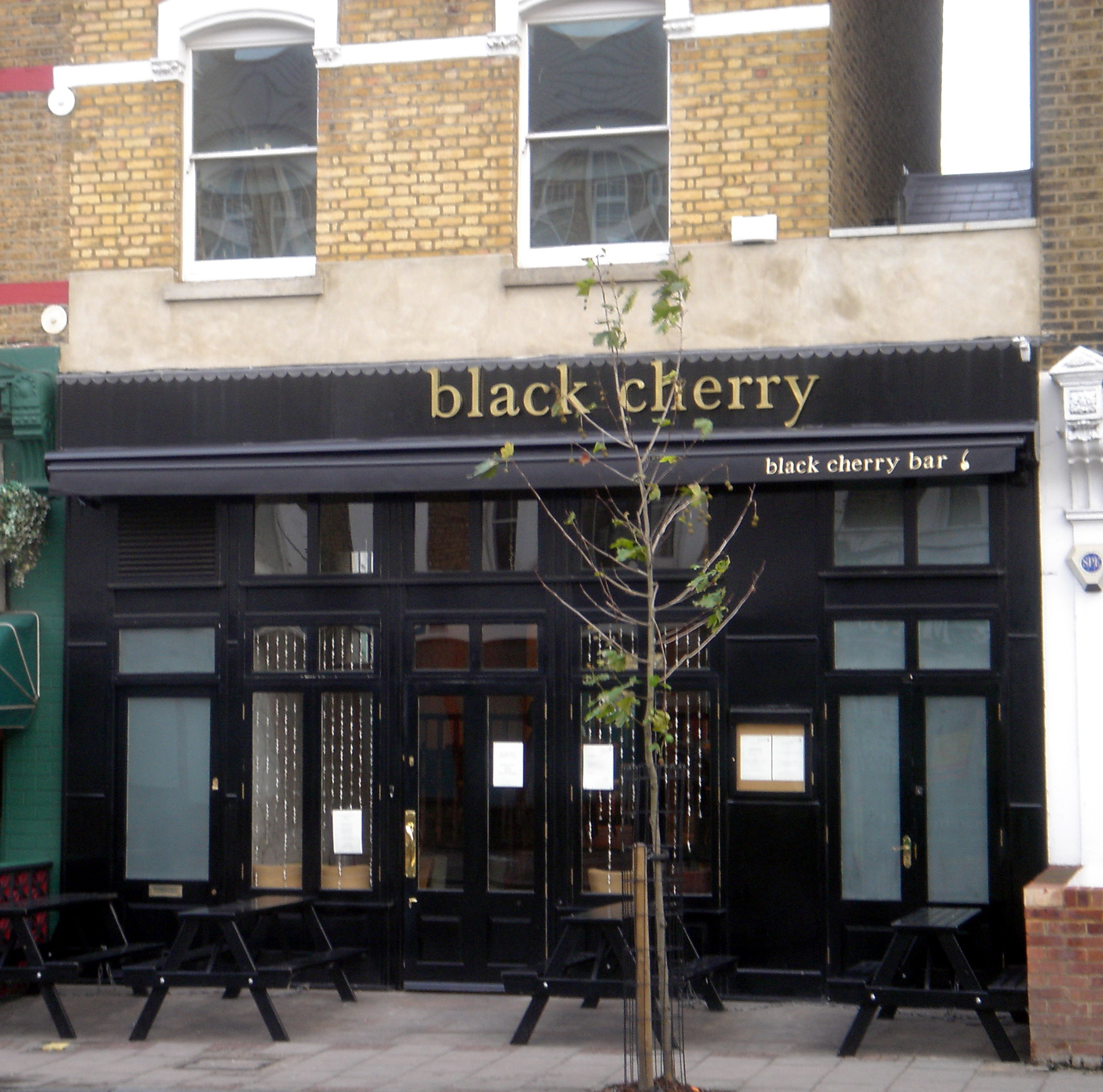
Black Cherry (bar & restaurant, closed), 21 Lordship Lane

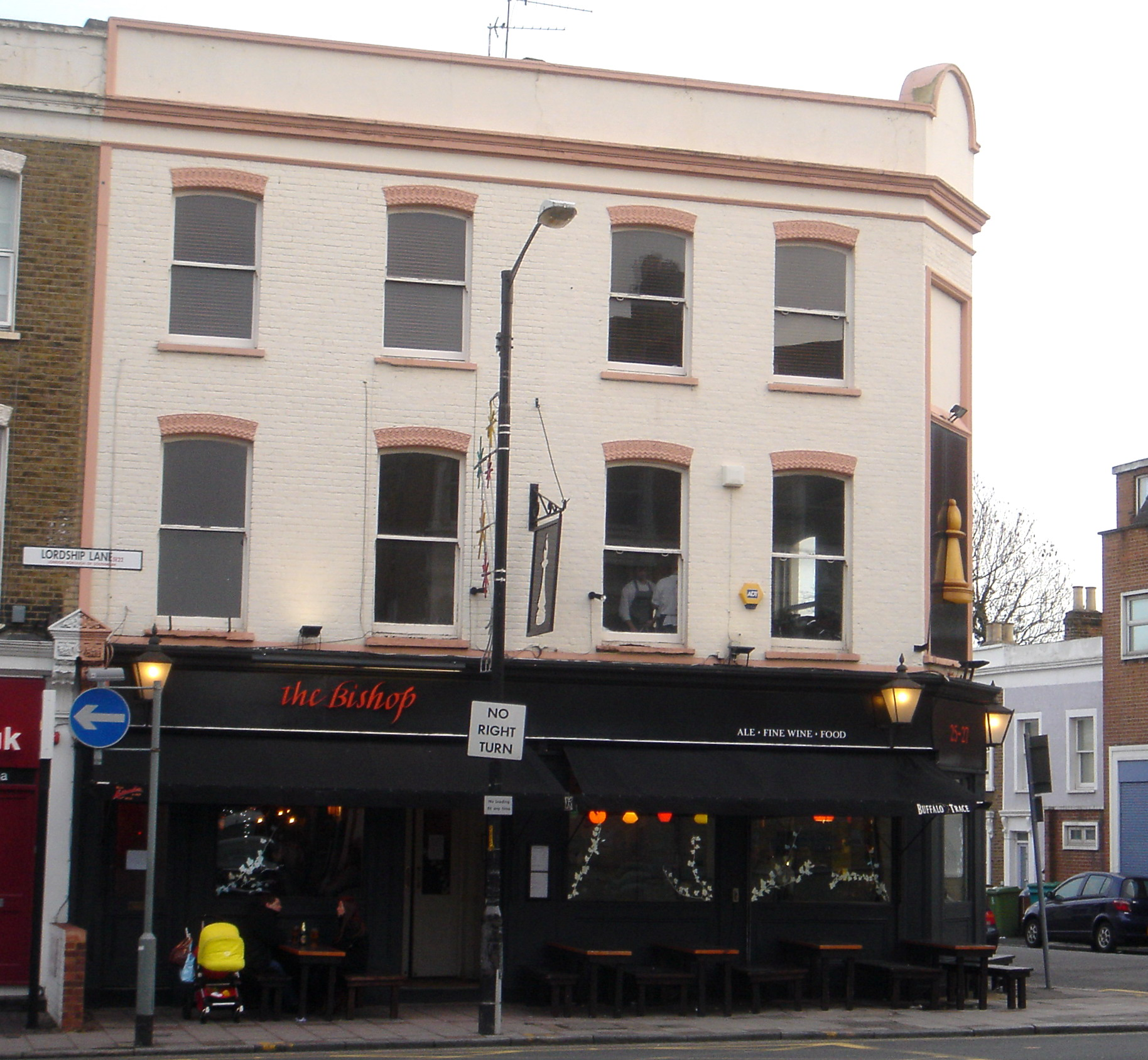
The Bishop (pub & restaurant), 27 Lordship Lane

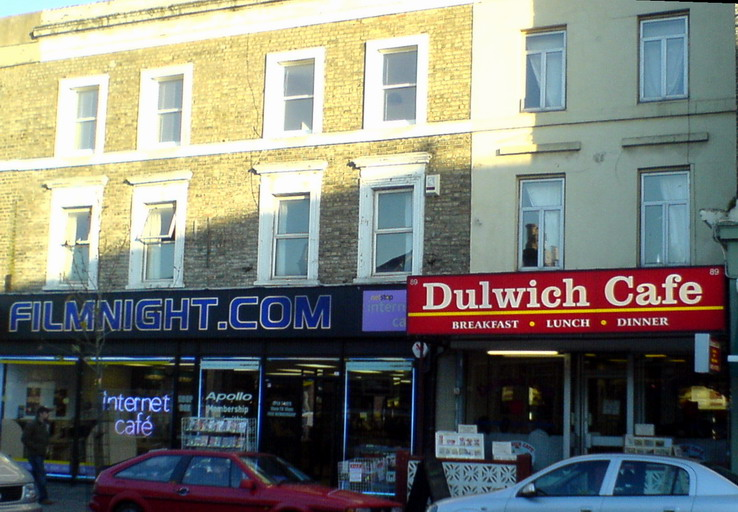
Dulwich Cafe, 89 Lordship Lane

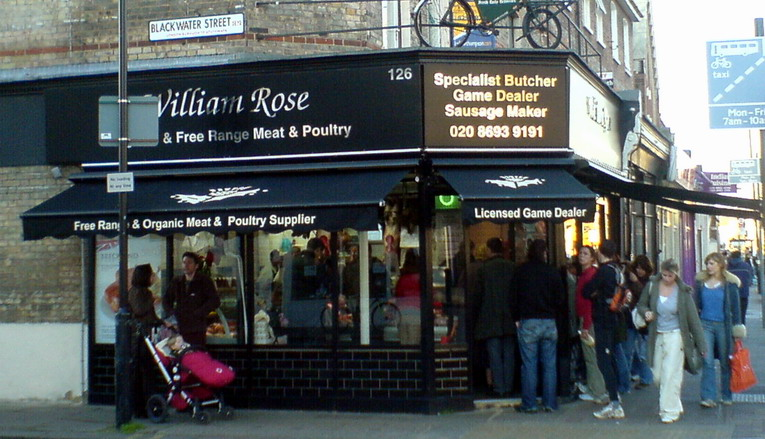
Willam Rose Butchers, 126 Lordship Lane

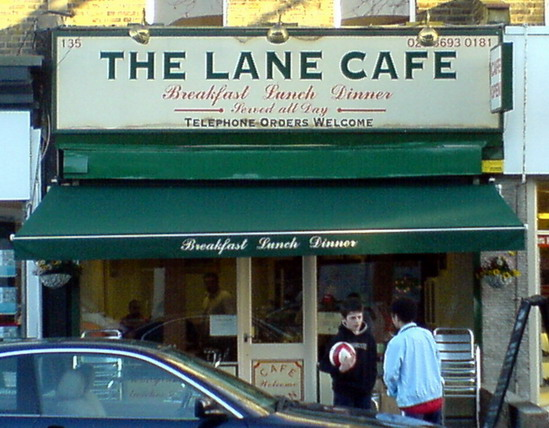
The Lane Cafe, closed, 135 Lordship Lane

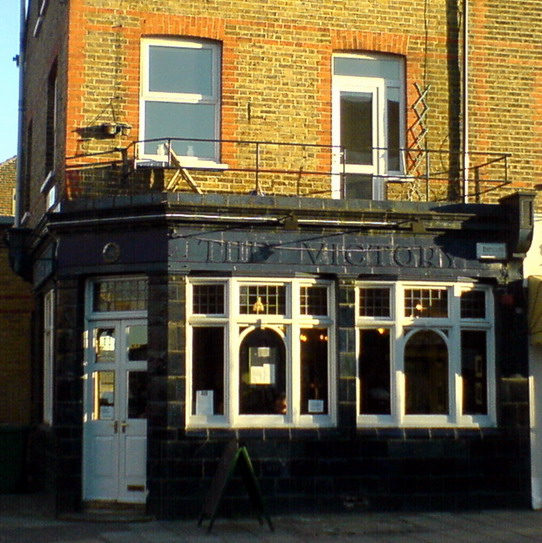
Franklins (bar & restaurant), 157 Lordship Lane

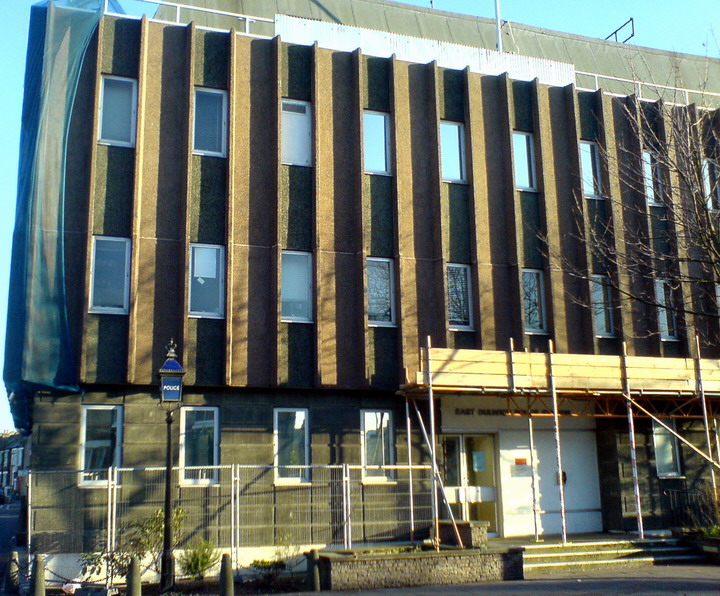
Police Station, now a school, 173–183 Lordship Lane

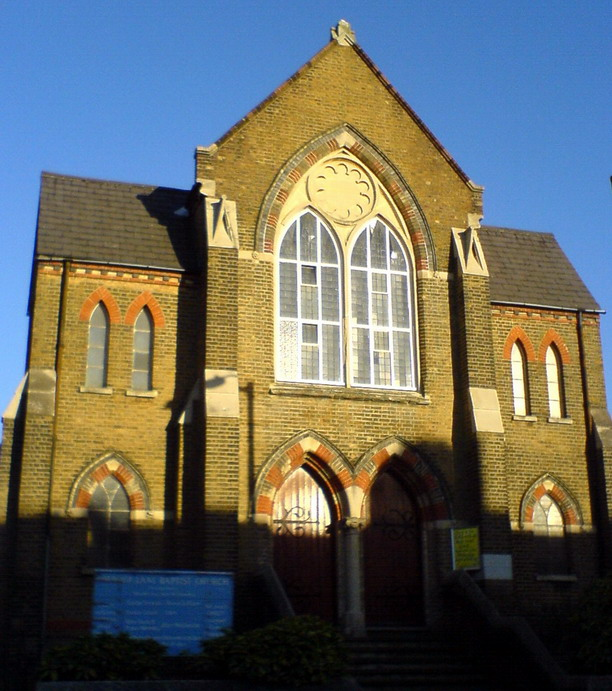
Baptist Church, 257 Lordship Lane

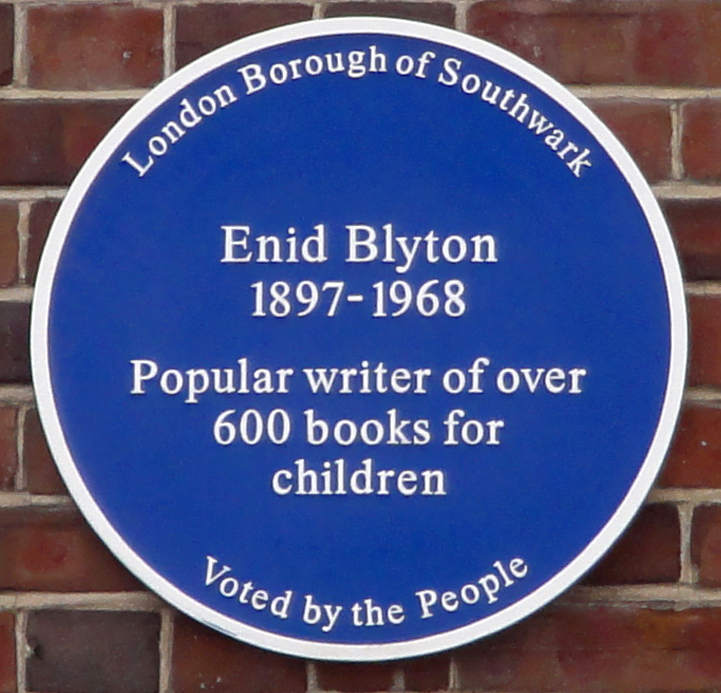
Enid Blyton blue plaque, 352 Lordship Lane

== See also ==
- Photographs ordered by address in Lordship Lane (Wikimedia Commons)
- Dulwich Library
