= Derby Playhouse production history =

The following is a chronological list of productions staged at the Derby Playhouse from 1975 to 2008. The Derby Playhouse was a theatre production company and the former name of the theatre which it owned and operated from its opening in 1975 until 2008, when the company ceased operating after a period in administration. Situated in Derby, England, the theatre is now known as the Derby Theatre and has been owned and operated by the University of Derby since 2009.

== List of past productions 1975–2008 ==
The list includes all Main House, in-house professional productions. It does not include many Studio, Theatre in Education (TIE), visiting professional or amateur performances, such as those of the Derby Gilbert & Sullivan Company, whose annual Gilbert and Sullivan shows played at the theatre from 1980 to 2003 and again after the theatre's reopening in 2009.

=== 1970s ===
==== 1975 ====
- My Fair Lady
- Hamlet
- Lloyd George Knew My Father
- Sleeping Beauty

==== 1976 ====
- Rosencrantz and Guildenstern Are Dead
- A View from the Bridge
- Cowardy Custard
- An Ideal Husband
- The Seagull starring Alan Bates
- The Norman Conquests
- The Miser
- Enter Sherlock Holmes
- Jack and the Beanstalk

==== 1977 ====
- Sleuth
- Macbeth
- A Taste of Honey
- The Importance of Being Earnest
- A Man for All Seasons
- Absurd Person Singular
- Joseph and the Amazing Technicolor Dreamcoat
- Equus
- Mother Goose

==== 1978 ====
- Romeo and Juliet
- Private Lives
- Irma La Douce
- Hedda Gabler
- Witness for the Prosecution
- Mrs. Warren's Profession
- Godspell
- Journey's End
- Dick Whittington

==== 1979 ====
- What the Butler Saw
- Murderer
- Bedroom Farce
- Donkeys' Years
- In Praise of Love
- Otherwise Engaged
- Ten Times Table
- King Lear
- Privates on Parade
- Aladdin

=== 1980s ===
==== 1980 ====
- An Inspector Calls
- Count Dracula
- Loot (play)
- Blithe Spirit
- The School for Scandal
- Whose Life Is It Anyway?
- Murder with Love
- Rookery Nook
- Pygmalion
- Clouds
- Relatively Speaking
- Cinderella

==== 1981 ====
- Funny Peculiar
- Night and Day
- Fallen Angels
- The Case of the Oily Levantine
- Habeas Corpus
- Sisterly Feelings
- All My Sons
- The Conspirator
- No More Sitting on the Old School Bench
- The Wizard of Oz
- The Adult Panto – Studio

==== 1982 ====
- Dr Jekyll and Mr Hyde
- Once a Catholic
- Piaf
- See How They Run
- When can I have a Banana Again – Studio
- Happy as a Sandbag
- The Hitch-Hiker's Guide to the Galaxy
- Operation Bad Apple
- Middle Age Spread
- The Gingerbread Man
- Dry Rot

==== 1983 ====
- Having a Ball!
- The Resistible Rise of Arturo Ui
- Play It Again, Sam
- The Elephant Man
- Present Laughter
- Having a Ball!
- Educating Rita
- Julius Caesar
- Taking Steps
- Pinocchio
- The Ghost Train

==== 1984 ====
- Dirty Linen and Newfoundland
- The Country Wife
- Stags and Hens
- Terra Nova
- French Without Tears
- Deathtrap
- Trafford Tanzi
- Love Bites
- Season's Greetings
- The Meg and Mog Show
- Charley's Aunt

==== 1985 ====
- Breezeblock Park
- The Caucasian Chalk Circle
- The Canterbury Tales
- Blood Relations
- You Never Can Tell
- Season's Greetings
- Blood Brothers
- Over the Bar
- Steaming
- The Snow Queen

==== 1986 ====
- The Anastasia File
- Intimate Exchanges :- Affairs in a Tent & A One Man Protest
- Sons of the Beach
- Intimate Exchanges :- A Pageant & A Game of Golf
- Tom Jones
- The Brewery Beano
- It's a Madhouse
- Charlie and the Chocolate Factory

==== 1987 ====
- Our Day Out
- A Midsummer Night's Dream
- Land of Hope and Gloria
- Waiting for Godot – Studio
- Cider with Rosie
- The Innocent Mistress
- The Children's Hour
- Gaslight
- The Scatterbrained Scarecrow of Oz

==== 1988 ====
- Masterpieces
- A Doll's House
- The Dark at the Top of the Stairs
- Sunday's Children
- Time and the Conways
- Private Lives
- Germinal
- The Queen of Spades
- Hansel and Gretel

==== 1989 ====
- Entertaining Mr Sloane
- Love Games
- Touched
- Noises Off
- The Piggy Bank
- Wicked Old Nellie by Lucy Gannon (Studio and tour)
- Heartbreak House
- The Art of Success
- Arsenic and Old Lace
- Robin Hood

=== 1990s ===
==== 1990 ====
- Glory!
- Selling the Sizzle
- Jane Eyre
- Self Portrait
- The School for Wives
- Tons of Money
- Rebecca
- Dick Whittington and His Cat

==== 1991 ====
- Teechers
- Double Double
- Hobson's Choice, winner of the 1991 TMA Award for Best Overall Production.
- Last of the Red Hot Lovers
- 84 Charing Cross Road
- She Stoops to Conquer
- Hard Times – Studio, Community Tour
- Driving Miss Daisy
- Mother Goose

==== 1992 ====
- And a Nightingale Sang
- My Sister Next Door – Studio
- On the Piste
- The Innocents
- Far from the Madding Crowd
- Blithe Spirit
- Grease
- Death of a Salesman
- Women in Love – Studio, Community Tour
- On the Piste
- Aladdin

==== 1993 ====
- Laurel and Hardy – Studio, Community Tour
- A Chorus of Disapproval
- Little Shop of Horrors
- Frankie and Johnny in the Clair de Lune – Studio
- Children of a Lesser God
- Outside Edge
- A Slice of Saturday Night
- The Lucky Chance
- Two – Studio
- My Cousin Rachel
- Cinderella

==== 1994 ====
- April in Paris – Tour in Hull Truck
- Les Liaisons Dangereuses
- An Evening with Gary Lineker
- Someone Who'll Watch Over Me – Studio
- Blood Money
- Passion Killers – co-production with Hull Truck
- Cabaret
- The Importance of Being Earnest
- Ham – Studio
- Absurd Person Singular
- Jack and the Beanstalk

==== 1995 ====
- Richard III
- Our Boys – co-production with Incidental Theatre. Transferred to Donmar Warehouse
- Oleanna
- Happy Families
- Assassins
- Derby 100 – Derby Playhouse Community Theatre
- A Passionate Woman – co-production with David Pugh Ltd. National Tour
- The Woman in Black – co-production with P.W. Productions. National Tour
- Comic Cuts – co-production with Triptych/Salisbury Playhouse
- Richard III
- Dick Whittington and His Cat

==== 1996 ====
- Tess of the d'Urbervilles – co-production with Salisbury Playhouse
- Time of My Life
- My Mother Said I Never Should – Studio
- The Rise and Fall of Little Voice
- Extremities
- Buster's Last Stand – Derby Playhouse Community Theatre
- A Chorus Line
- Gym and Tonic – co-production with Thorndike Theatre
- Pow (play) – Studio, co-production with Paines Plough
- Blood Wedding – co-production with Northern Stage
- Aladdin

==== 1997 ====
- The Rivals
- Not a Game for Boys
- Eleanor Rigby – Derby Playhouse Youth Theatre
- Miss Julie – Studio
- Adam Bede
- Lips Together, Teeth Apart
- By the Baseball Ground – Derby Playhouse Community Theatre
- The Grapevine
- 'Tis Pity She's a Whore
- Mr Wonderful
- Three Viewings – Studio
- The Subtle Art of Boiling Lobsters – Studio
- Female, 29, GSOH – Studio
- Price of a Good Dinner – Studio
- Sleeping Beauty

==== 1998 ====
- Taking Steps
- The Oedipus Plays – Derby Playhouse Youth Theatre
- Mother Courage – co-production with Edinburgh Royal Lyceum Theatre
- Lucky Sods
- The Glass Menagerie
- Off Yer Trolley – Derby Playhouse Community Theatre
- Blues in the Night
- The Collector – co-production with Edinburgh Royal Lyceum Theatre
- Anna Karenina – co-production with Shared Experience
- Krapp's Last Tape – Studio, co-production with RSC
- The Black Dahlia – co-production with Method and Madness
- Babes in the Wood

==== 1999 ====
- Bouncers
- Twelfth Night – co-production with Northern Broadsides
- Coming of Age – Derby Playhouse Youth Theatre
- Things Fall Apart – co-production with The Performance Studio Workshop of Nigeria
- Boyband
- The Ride Down Mt. Morgan
- Und – Studio, co-production with The Wrestling School
- Bouncers
- The Passion Play – Derby Playhouse Community Play
- Soul Train
- Watching the Sand from the Sea
- Masquerade – co-production with The State Small Theatre of Vilnius
- Mother Goose

=== 2000s ===
==== 2000 ====
- A Clockwork Orange – co-production with Northern Stage
- Animal Farm – co-production with Northern Stage
- Perfect Days
- Shylock – Studio, co-production with Guy Masterson Productions
- Pericles – Derby Playhouse Youth Theatre
- Speaking in Tongues
- Perfect Pitch
- No Fishing! – Derby Playhouse Community Theatre
- God and Stephen Hawking
- Leader of the Pack co-production with Churchill Theatre Bromley
- Sparkleshark – co-production with the National Theatre
- Passing Places
- Cinderella

==== 2001 ====
- Lady Day at Emerson's Bar and Grill – Studio
- The Contractor – co-production with Oxford Stage Company
- The Blue Room
- Tales of Hans Anderson – Derby Playhouse Youth Theatre
- Nineteen Eighty-Four – co-production with Northern Stage
- Danny Bouncing
- Ain't Misbehavin'
- Lady Day at Emerson's Bar and Grill – Studio
- The School for Scandal
- On the Piste
- Jack and the Beanstalk
- A Life in the Theatre

==== 2002 ====
- Great Expectations
- Misconceptions
- Class of '77 – Derby Playhouse Youth Theatre
- Up 'n' Under
- The Browning Version
- Way Upstream
- Life of Galileo – Derby Playhouse Community Theatre
- Dick Whittington

==== 2003 ====
- Educating Rita (1 February – 1 March 2003)
- My Dad's Corner Shop (22 March – 12 April 2003) by Ray Grewal (The play won Grewal the Meyer-Whitworth Award in 2001. This was its first main-stage production)
- Viking Tales (16 – 19 April 2003) – Derby Playhouse Youth Theatre
- The Entertainer (26 April – 24 May 2003)
- Oh, What a Lovely War! (31 May – 28 June 2003) – Pro & Derby Playhouse Community Theatre
- Blithe Spirit (6 September – 4 October 2003)
- Dracula (11 October – 1 November 2003)
- Loot (8 – 29 November 2003)
- A Christmas Carol (6 December 2003 – 24 January 2004)

==== 2004 ====
- Shirley Valentine (31 January – 5 February 2004)
- Private Lives (6 March – 3 April 2004)
- Josefina – Derby Playhouse Youth Theatre
- Sweeney Todd: The Demon Barber of Fleet Street (24 April – 2 May 2004)
- A Midsummer Night's Dream (29 May – 3 July 2004)
- Silver Ghosts & Spitfires (7 – 10 July 2004) – Derby Playhouse Community Theatre
- Amadeus (28 August – 25 September 2004)
- Frankenstein (2 – 30 October 2004)
- Kafka's Dick (6 – 27 November 2004)
- Merlin & The Winter King (4 December 2004 – 22 January 2005)

==== 2005 ====
- Can't Pay? Won't Pay! (29 January – 26 February 2005)
- Mary Stuart (5 – 26 March 2005) – with Big Picture Company
- Hooray for Hollywood (30 March – 2 April 2005) – Derby Playhouse Youth Theatre
- Company (16 April – 21 May 2005)
- Romeo and Juliet (28 May – 2 July 2005)
- Bold Nelson's Praise (6 – 9 July 2005) – Derby Playhouse Community Theatre
- Arsenic and Old Lace (20 August – 17 September 2005)
- Macbeth (24 September – 22 October 2005)
- Serial Killers (29 October – 26 November 2005)
- Arabian Nights (3 December 2005 – 28 January 2006)

==== 2006 ====
- Henceforward... (4 February – 4 March 2006)
- Master Class (11 March – 8 April 2006)
- Into the Woods (22 April – 20 May 2006)
- Animal Farm (27 May – 23 June 2006) – Pro & Derby Playhouse Community Theatre
- A Christmas Carol (2 December 2006 – 20 January 2007)

==== 2007 ====
- The Importance of Being Earnest (27 January – 24 February 2007)
- Johnno (3 – 31 March 2007) co-production with La Boite Theatre.
- Merrily We Roll Along (14 April – 19 May 2007)
- As You Like It (26 May – 23 June 2007)
- The Tempest – Derby Playhouse Youth Theatre
- Moon Landing (6 September – 6 October 2007) starring Glenn Carter (world premiere)
- Stepping Out (13 October – 17 November 2007)
- Treasure Island (24 November 2007 – 2 February 2008) adapted by Karen Louise Hebden from the novel by Robert Louis Stevenson

==== 2008 ====
- The Killing of Sister George (13 September – 11 October 2008) – starring Jenny Eclair and directed by Cal McCrystal.
