= Derby Playhouse =

Derby Playhouse was a theatre production company based in Derby, England and the former name of the theatre which it owned and operated from its opening in 1975 until 2008, when the company ceased operating after a period in administration. The theatre was subsequently reopened in 2009 as the Derby Theatre and is now owned and operated by the University of Derby, where it currently runs its Theatre Arts degree. During its tenure at the theatre, the Derby Playhouse company gained a national reputation for its productions, particularly the works of Stephen Sondheim. It also premiered new theatrical works as well as giving the regional premieres of several others.

== History ==
The original Playhouse had opened as the Little Theatre in a converted church hall on Becket Street in 1948. In 1952, the company moved to another converted venue in Sacheverel Street and survived a major fire in 1956. In the 1960s and early 1970s the British government invested in the Arts Council of Great Britain's "Housing the Arts" fund. The fund enabled cities to renovate existing theatres and commission new ones. In response, the company formed the New Theatre Trust to raise the local funding necessary for its own purpose-built theatre. Roderick Ham, who had previously designed the Thorndike Theatre in Leatherhead, was commissioned to design the new theatre. The Derby City Council offered the land (part of the new Eagle Centre shopping development). The new Derby Playhouse, with a seating capacity of 535, was officially opened on 20 September 1975 by the 11th Duke of Devonshire.

The company experienced financial difficulties in 2002, running a trading deficit of £400,000, the biggest in its history, and nearly closed. By 2004 it had recovered and was breaking box-office records. Geoff Sweeney, the company's Development Director at the time, suggested that it might seek new larger premises on the River Trent. However, the company again ran into serious financial problems in 2007 which ultimately spelled its demise. On 29 November 2007, following the refusal of Derby City Council to advance £40,000 from their 2008 grant, the board of trustees of the theatre announced that it was going into voluntary liquidation and that performances would cease immediately. Nevertheless, the cast and crew of Treasure Island went ahead and put on that evening's performance. After the curtain call, the cast were joined on stage by the rest of the staff, with Karen Hebden (the theatre's chief executive and director of the show), Michael Hall, and Jonathan Powers (two former chairmen of the Playhouse board) who then addressed the audience and press, asking them to fight for the city's theatre and get the Playhouse open again. The following day, the board of trustees announced that the company had been put into administration.

The administrators allowed the Playhouse to reopen on 7 December 2007 to finish its run of Treasure Island. The theatre was being operated by a skeleton of essential staff, initially working unpaid to get it up and running again. A fund was set up to accept donations to keep the Playhouse going, as it was now operating as a charitable trust relying on ticket sales and donations alone. Tickets for a modified Spring/Summer 2008 season, which had already been on sale for some weeks before the closure, were put back on sale during December and January while an appeal was made to the Arts Council. However, the Arts Council refused the appeal in January 2008, and the theatre closed after the last performance of Treasure Island on 2 February 2008.

At a meeting on 30 July 2008 the creditors voted to accept a rescue package put together by the company's new board of trustees. The theatre reopened on 13 September 2008 with The Killing of Sister George which ran until 18 October. However, it proved to be the company's last production. The theatre was subsequently sold to the University of Derby and reopened in October 2009 as the Derby Theatre.

== Productions ==
The new Derby Playhouse opened with My Fair Lady. The first season also included Hamlet and Alan Bates in The Seagull, a production which went on to play for a season in London. Mark Woolgar was Resident Director for the first five seasons, programming work ranging from Shakespeare, Shaw and Ibsen to Ayckbourn, Orton and Coward. Christopher Honer joined the Playhouse as Artistic Director in 1980. Over the next seven years, the Playhouse's major productions included All My Sons with Miranda Richardson, Piaf with Caroline Quentin, The Resistible Rise of Arturo Ui starring Ben Roberts; new plays such as Rony Robinson's The Brewery Beano and Don Shaw's The Conspirator; and box office successes such as Funny Peculiar, Having A Ball! and Blood Brothers. During this time, the Derby Playhouse Studio, under the various direction of John North, David Milne and Claire Grove, provided a year-round programme of productions and mounted community tours and a Theatre in Education programme.

In 1987, Annie Castledine succeeded Christopher Honer as Artistic Director, and for the next three years, the Playhouse saw a completely different style of theatre. Revivals of plays such as The Innocent Mistress, The Children's Hour and The Dark at the Top of the Stairs together with re-interpretations of classics such as A Doll's House and Jane Eyre. There were also plays from the popular repertoire such as Arsenic and Old Lace, Gaslight and Noises Off alongside new work such as Sunday's Children, The Queen of Spades, Selling the Sizzle and Self Portrait and a series of co-productions with such companies as Shared Experience, Paines Plough and Temba. During this period, the theatre's productions became known for the strength of their on-stage visual imagery, and the Playhouse was shortlisted for the Prudential Awards.

In the summer of 1990, Derby Playhouse faced the prospect of greatly reduced funding as Derbyshire County Council had cut their entire arts budget, depriving the Playhouse of £130,000 of revenue grant. However, the City Council offered the theatre an additional grant, which enabled the Playhouse to continue to operate, although on a smaller scale. According to Lyn Gardner writing in The Guardian, "it was Castledine's head that was demanded by the council as the price of underwriting the theatre's deficit." From the summer of 1990, when Castledine left the Playhouse to Christmas 1991, Executive Director, David Edwards, was in charge of scheduling the programme, which culminated in the Playhouse's production of Hobson's Choice winning the Theatrical Management Association's Regional Theatre Award for Best Overall Production.

In spring 1991, Mark Clements was appointed Artistic Director. His first season opened with a production of And A Nightingale Sang. The production of John Godber's On The Piste, was repeated later in the year, and again in 2001, and Godber's work remained a popular part of the programme during Clements' tenure. During the Clements period the programme included a variety of work, ranging from classics such as Death of a Salesman, Aphra Behn's Lucky Chance and Shakespeare's Richard III, to contemporary drama such as Our Boys, The Rise and Fall of Little Voice and Children of a Lesser God, and newly commissioned work such as Tess of the d'Urbervilles, Passion Killers and Blood Money. Musicals became an important part of the programme, starting with Grease, and including Little Shop of Horrors, Cabaret and Assassins, while the pantomimes written by Mark Clements and Michael Vivian drew in record numbers at Christmas time.

In 2002 both Mark Clements and David Edwards left the company. Karen Hebden was appointed as chief executive, closely followed by Stephen Edwards as Creative Producer. Over the following years the Playhouse gained a national reputation for its productions, particularly the works of Stephen Sondheim, with in-house productions of Sweeney Todd, Into the Woods, Company and Merrily We Roll Along. Three of these productions featured Glenn Carter, who has also appeared in other non-Sondheim productions at the Playhouse. One of these was a new music drama, Moon Landing, in which he played Buzz Aldrin. Written, composed and directed by Stephen Edwards, Moon Landing was subsequently nominated in the Best Musical Production category of the 2008 TMA Awards. An original cast recording was also made, recorded live on the night of the final performance. The company's last production before its permanent closure was The Killing of Sister George starring Jenny Eclair and directed by Cal McCrystal. Its run ended on 18 October 2008. The rest of the 2008 autumn season, including the Christmas production of Peter Pan, was cancelled.
