= Ralph Brown =

English actor

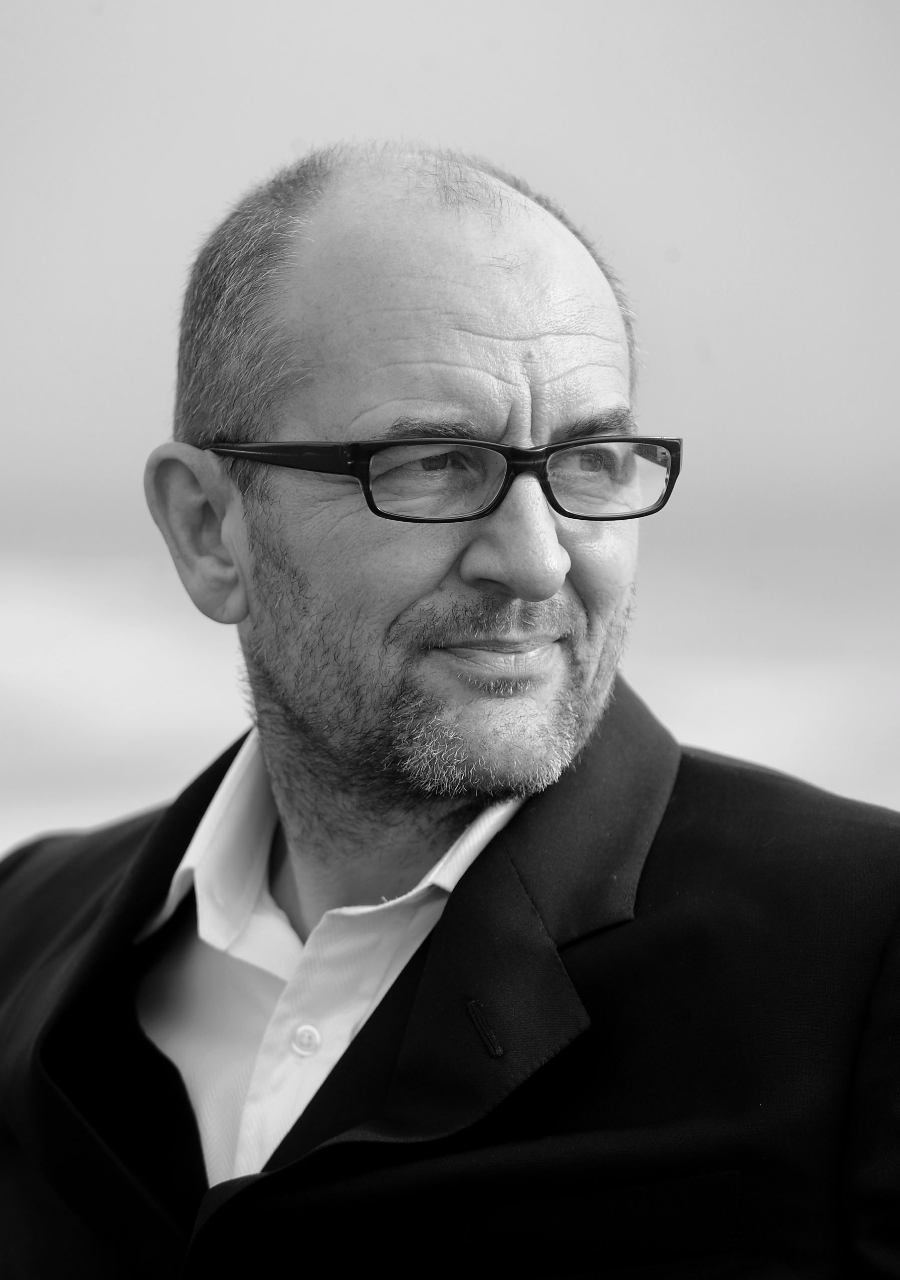
- Brown on 26 March 2009
- Born: Ralph William John Brown; 18 June 1957 (age 69); Cambridge, Cambridgeshire, England
- Occupations: Actor; writer
- Years active: 1982–present
- Spouse: Jenny Jules (m. 1992)
- Website: twitter.com/Ralphwjbrown

Ralph William John Brown (born 18 June 1957) is an English actor and writer, known for playing Danny the drug dealer in Withnail and I, the security guard Aaron (a.k.a. "85") in Alien 3, DJ Bob Silver in The Boat That Rocked aka Pirate Radio, super-roadie Del Preston in Wayne's World 2, the pilot Ric Olié in Star Wars: Episode I – The Phantom Menace, President Lyndon Johnson in Godfather of Harlem and Henry Clinton in Turn: Washington's Spies. He won the Samuel Beckett Award for his first play Sanctuary written for Joint Stock Theatre Company in 1987, and the Raindance and Sapporo Film Festival awards for his first screenplay for the British film New Year's Day in 2001.

== Early life ==
Brown was born in Cambridge, the son of Heather R. and John F. W. Brown. He has two younger brothers, Paul and Andrew, and a younger sister Rebecca. He lived in Portsmouth, Hampshire until the age of seven, then moved to East Sussex where he attended Lewes Priory School. He graduated from the London School of Economics and Political Science with a Bachelor of Laws (LLB) degree in 1979.

== Career ==
=== Films ===
His film roles include Dil's on-off boyfriend Dave in the Academy Award-winning film The Crying Game, Danny the drug dealer in Withnail & I, Great Train Robber Ronnie Biggs in Buster, roadie Del Preston in Wayne's World 2, teacher and rugby league player Phil in Up 'n' Under, prison guard captain Mr Burton in Mean Machine, Sgt Major Harris in the Paul Schrader film Dominion: Prequel to the Exorcist, and CIA renegade Mr Collins alongside Wesley Snipes in The Contractor. In 1997, Brown appeared in Steven Spielberg's slavery epic Amistad. In 2007, he was cast in Caught in the Act, an independent British film. Brown starred as DJ Bob Silver in The Boat That Rocked aka Pirate Radio (2009), written and directed by Richard Curtis, Huge directed by Ben Miller (2009), The Kid (2010), directed by Nick Moran, Mission: London, a Bulgarian comedy directed by Dimitar Mitoviski which premiered in Sofia on 13 April 2010, and Sus (2010), written by Barrie Keeffe and directed by Robert Heath. He worked on the film Killing Bono (2010) and the feature film Dark Tide (2010) in Cape Town, opposite Halle Berry, I, Anna (2011) with Gabriel Byrne and Charlotte Rampling, then went on to work on Tower Block (2012) in London, Jack the Giant Slayer (2013) directed by Bryan Singer, and Stoker (2013) in Nashville, directed by Park Chan-wook. In 2018 he appeared in Final Score with Dave Bautista, directed by Scott Mann, about West Ham United's now-abandoned Boleyn Ground. He worked with Will Smith in Ang Lee's Gemini Man (2019).

=== Television ===
Among TV appearances, Brown appeared as PC Pete Muswell in The Bill from 1985 to 1986; guest starred as Captain Carlisle in A Touch of Frost in 1996; appeared in Dennis Potter's Karaoke in 1995; portrayed, to much acclaim, Prince John in the BBC's adaptation of Sir Walter Scott's Ivanhoe in 1997; appeared as John Geddes in the ITV post-apocalyptic drama serial The Last Train; appeared as the moustachioed policeman Wintersgill in the Channel 4/Showtime series Cape Wrath; and did a memorable turn as shaven-headed gang-boss "Miami Vice" in the 2000 series Lock, Stock...The Series.

In 2005, he appeared in Coronation Street as Barney, roadie to Status Quo, and with Julia Davis in the cult TV sitcom Nighty Night as perverted new-age sex therapist Jacques. In 2007, he appeared in the final two episodes of Life on Mars as Frank Morgan, an interim DCI in 1973 sequences, and Sam's (John Simm's) surgeon in 2006 sequences.

Brown played Sarah Solemani's father in Him & Her, which began airing in 2010 and continued through 2014 for BBC Three comedy, winning a BAFTA for the final series, "The Wedding." In 2012, he worked on Inspector George Gently with Martin Shaw, The Poison Tree for ITV, and The Mimic for C4. In 2013, he worked on the aborted Marvin Gaye film Sexual Healing directed by Julien Temple, and the ABC series The Assets in Vilnius, Lithuania. In 2014, he was cast in Babylon for C4 and Elementary for CBS, followed by Turn: Washington's Spies for AMC, playing General Sir Henry Clinton, leader of the redcoats. Brown returned for seasons 3 and 4 of the series. He also played Johann Fennhoff / Ivchenko, in Agent Carter for Marvel, and guest starred on Blacklist.

In 2015 Brown starred in all ten episodes of Legends with Sean Bean, with whom he had worked on Extremely Dangerous in the early 1990s. In 2016-17 he returned to Prague with showrunner Ken Biller to shoot Genius: Einstein for Nat Geo, which premiered at the Tribeca Film Festival in April 2017.

In June 2016, Brown played the role of Bob Clay in the BBC film Reg.

In September 2017 Brown travelled to Guadeloupe for a guest role in the BBC show Death in Paradise.

In 2021, Brown portrayed former U.S. President Lyndon Johnson in two episodes of Godfather of Harlem, a series on EPIX which explores the intersection between the criminal underworld and civil rights movement in the 1960s.

=== Documentary ===
Brown has appeared in three feature-length documentary films : Scala!!! directed by Ali Catterall and Jane Giles from 2023 about the cult cinema in London where he worked in the late 70s and early 80s, War Game directed by Jesse Moss and Tony Gerber, a re-imagining of the Jan 6th invasion of the US Capitol, and 2025's Stand or Fall: The Remarkable Rise of Brighton & Hove Albion a history of the last 25 years of his beloved football club The Seagulls.

=== Theatre ===
In his early years, Brown was involved with the Moving Parts Theatre Company with Rachel Feldberg, Ruth Mackenzie, Anita Lewton, and Saffron Myers. John Godber adapted A Clockwork Orange for Man In The Moon, King's Road, then Brown appeared in West written & directed by Steven Berkoff at the Donmar for five months (also shot for C4), followed by Royal Court Theatre's Panic, Joint Stock's Deadlines, The RSC's Earwig by Paula Milne, and The Everyman in Liverpool playing the title role in Macbeth. He retired from the stage shortly thereafter, and returned briefly 20 years later at The Bush Theatre to play guitar in punk play The Dysfunkshonalz by writer Mike Packer. After only appearing in one play in 30 years Brown joined the company of The Ferryman on Broadway in February 2019 which won four Tony Awards for Best Play, Best Director, Best Set Design and Best Costume. Brown starred as IRA Commander Jimmy Muldoon in The Ferryman, which played at the Bernard B. Jacobs Theatre from 19 February until 7 July 2019.

==== As a writer ====
Ralph Brown wrote the play Sanctuary for Joint Stock Theatre Company in 1987 which toured the UK and won the Samuel Beckett Award in 1987 for best first play.

The No-Neck Monsters Theatre Company brought the playwright and actor to Washington, D.C. from London to adapt his 1987 Samuel Beckett Award-winning new play Sanctuary. Re-written as a rap musical for the "No Necks", the show became a successful and controversial production capturing homelessness, runaways and crack hitting the streets of D.C. Scott Davenport Richards wrote the music for the rap musical and it was directed by Gwendolyn Wynne. The first rap musical in the region The Washington Post, NPR, American Theatre Magazine and McNeil/Lehrer Newshour amongst others reported on the production. The production was nominated for three Helen Hayes Awards: Outstanding Resident Musical, Outstanding Lead Actress (Deidre L. Johnson) in a Resident Musical, and Outstanding Sound Design. Performers featured were Teagle F. Bougere, Erik Todd Dellums, Paul G. Griffin, Deidra L. Johnson, Helen Patton and Barbara Robinson.

== Writing ==
Brown has written two plays, both rap musicals: Sanctuary for Joint Stock Theatre Company (Samuel Beckett Award 1987), adapted for the stage in Washington, D.C., as Sanctuary D.C. produced by No-Neck Monsters Theatre Company (three nominations for Helen Hayes Award 1988). His second play The House That Crack Built has never been produced.

Brown wrote the screenplay for the film New Year's Day directed by Suri Krishnamma in 1999, released in 2001 after screening at Sundance Film Festival and winning Raindance Film Festival award in 2001 and Sapporo Film Festival in the same year.

Brown also wrote the screenplays for the abandoned films Red Light Runners, High Times and In God's Footsteps.

He was a regular contributor to the Readers Recommend music blog in The Guardian, now at Song-Bar.com

== Social media ==
Brown joined Twitter in November 2008. His blog is titled My Pop Life.

== Personal life ==
Brown has been married to actress Jenny Jules since 1992. He lives in New York City. He is a fan of Brighton and Hove Albion. When Attila the Stockbroker was the club's DJ at the Withdean Stadium, he put together a version of Sussex by the Sea which featured Brown on saxophone and was played at home matches.

== Filmography ==
Year	Title	Role	Notes
1984	The Hit	Second Man	
1987	Withnail and I	Danny	
1988	Buster	Ronnie Biggs	
1989	Scandal	Paul Mann	
1989	Diamond Skulls	Jack	
1991	Impromptu	Eugène Delacroix	
1991	The Pope Must Die	Doctor	
1992	Alien 3	Francis Aaron ("85")	
1992	The Crying Game	Dave	
1993	Undercover Blues	Leamington	
1993	Wayne's World 2	Del Preston	
1994	Don't Get Me Started	Larry Swift	
1997	Amistad	Lieutenant Gedney	
1998	Up 'n' Under	Phil	
1999	Star Wars: Episode I – The Phantom Menace	Ric Olié	
2000	New Year's Day	Mr Diamond	Also writer
2001	Mean Machine	Burton	
2002	The Final Curtain	Timothy (Channel Controller)	
2003	I'll Be There	Digger	
2004	Exorcist: The Beginning	Sergeant Major	
2005	Dominion: Prequel to the Exorcist	Sergeant Major	
2005	Stoned	Gysin	
2006	Eragon	Psychic Twins	Additional Scene
2007	Flood	Mel's Dad	
2007	Straightheads	Jamie	
2007	The Contractor	Jeremy Collins	Direct-to-video film
2009	The Boat That Rocked	DJ Bob	
2010	Mission London	Detective Collway	
2010	The Kid	Gordon Peters	
2010	Sus	Karn	
2010	Huge	Neil	
2011	Killing Bono	Leo	
2012	I, Anna	George Stone	
2012	Dark Tide	Brady	
2012	Tower Block	Neville	
2013	Stoker	Sheriff Howard	
2013	Jack the Giant Slayer	General Entin	
2013	All Things to All Men	McDeer	
2014	Walking with the Enemy	Grudez	
2015	Hard Tide	Gaz	
2016	Jackie	Dave Powers	
2018	Final Score	Steed	
2019	Gemini Man	Del Patterson	
2023	Genie	Sorcerer	
2024	War Game	Lieutenant General Roger Simms	Documentary

== Television ==
Year	Title	Role	Notes
1982	BBC Television Shakespeare	John	Episode:The Merry Wives of Windsor
1985–1986	The Bill	PC Pete Muswell	11 episodes
1986	London's Burning: The Movie	Second Policeman	TV film
1988	ScreenPlay	Insp. Drury	Episode: "The Black and Blue Lamp"
1988	Christabel	Lange	1 episode
1992	Van der Valk	Inspector Rep	Episode: "Proof of Life"
1992	The Ruth Rendell Mysteries	Peter Mullin	Episode: "Talking to Strange Men"
1993	Between the Lines	D.A.C. John Convey	Episode: "Manoevure 11"
1996	A Touch of Frost	Captain Carlisle	Episode: "Unknown Soldiers"
1996	Dalziel and Pascoe	Sam Connon	Episode: "A Clubbable Woman"
1996	Karaoke	Peter Beasley	Episode: "Tuesday"
1996	Cold Lazarus	Peter Beasley	1 episode
1997	The Place of the Dead	Sgt. Bob Mann	TV movie
1997	Ivanhoe	Prince John	Miniseries
1997	Jonathan Creek	Roy Pilgrim	Episode: "No Trace of Tracy"
1999	Peak Practice	Stephen Westwood	Episode: "Passion"
1999	Cleopatra	Guevarius	2 episodes
1999	The Last Train	Jonathan Geddes	2 episodes
1999	Extremely Dangerous	Joe Connor	4 episodes
2000	Lexx	Duke	4 episodes
2000	Lock, Stock...	Miami Vice	7 episodes
2000	NCS: Manhunt	Ray du Barriatte	TV movie
2001	The Grimleys	Frankie Fate	Episode: "The Grimley Curse"
2001	Waking the Dead	Mike Coleman	2 episodes
2002	NCS: Manhunt	Ray du Barriatte	5 episodes
2002	A Tribute to The Likely Lads	Gary	TV movie
2003	The Agency	Andrei Kachan	Episode: "Mi Cena con Andrei"
2004	Lawless	Phil Howell	Miniseries
2005	Comedy Lab	Voice	Episode: "Modern Toss"
2005	Nighty Night	Jacques	
2005	Spooks	Paul Seymour	Episode: "The Innocent"
2005	Coronation Street	Barney	6 episodes
2006	Filthy Rich: Cattle Drive	Truesdale	4 episodes
2006–2008	Modern Toss	Various	12 episodes
2007	Cold Blood	Bob Massum	7 episodes
2007	Life on Mars	Frank Morgan	2 episodes
2007	Cape Wrath	Wintersgill	8 episodes
2007	Nearly Famous	Dominic Soloman	7 episodes
2010	Jack Taylor	Sutton	Episode: "The Guards"
2010–2013	Him & Her	Nigel	8 episodes
2012	Inspector George Gently	Melvyn Rattigan	Episode: "Gently in the Cathedral"
2013	Dallas	Justice of the Peace	Episode: "Love & Family"
2013–2014	The Mimic	Denholm/Neil's Dad	2 episodes
2014	Pramface	Terry	Episode: "A Proper Little Family"
2014	Law & Order: UK	DS Darren Grady	Episode: "I Predict a Riot"
2014	Elementary	Tim Sherrington	2 episodes
2014	The Assets	Wallace Austin	Miniseries
2014	Babylon	Grant Delgado	5 episodes
2015	Agent Carter	Johann Fennhoff / Ivchenko	4 episodes
2015	The Blacklist	Roger Hobbs	2 episodes
2015	Legends	Terence Graves	10 episodes
2015–2017	Turn: Washington's Spies	General Henry Clinton	12 episodes
2016	Reg	Bob Clay	TV movie
2017	Genius: Einstein	Max Planck	6 episodes
2018	Death in Paradise	Charlie Blake	Episode 7
2021–2023	Godfather of Harlem	Lyndon Johnson	4 episodes
2022	New Amsterdam	Sid Chiltern	Episode: "The Crossover"
2023	Leverage: Redemption	Ramsey	Episode: "The Museum Makeover Job"
2024	Sexy Beast	Roger Riley	3 episodes
2024	American Sports Story	Tremaine	Episode: "Who Killed Aaron Hermandez?"

Videogames
Year	Title	Role
2018	Red Dead Redemption II	The Local Pedestrian Population
2022	Lego Star Wars: The Skywalker Saga	Ric Olié
