= Up and under =

Up and under may refer to:

- Another name for the bomb, a type of kick in various codes of football
- Up and under, a basketball move
- Up 'n' Under, play by English playwright, John Godber
- Up 'n' Under II, sequel to the play by John Godber
- Up 'n' Under (film), film adaptation directed by John Godber
- The Up-and-Under (novel series), a series of novels by Seanan McGuire
