= Up 'n' Under (film) =

- DVD cover
- Directed by: John Godber
- Written by: John Godber
- Based on: Up 'n' Under by John Godber
- Produced by: Mark Thomas
- Starring: Gary Olsen; Richard Ridings; Samantha Janus; Ralph Brown; Neil Morrissey
- Cinematography: Alan M. Trow
- Edited by: Chris Lawrence
- Music by: Mark Thomas
- Production company: Touchdown Films
- Distributed by: Entertainment Film Distributors
- Release date: 23 January 1998
- Running time: 99 minutes
- Country: United Kingdom
- Language: English
- Budget: US$1 million
- Box office: US$12 million

Up 'n' Under is a British 1998 film adaptation of the John Godber play of the same name.

John Godber scripted and made his directorial debut with this adaptation of his play. The film was shot in Cardiff, Wales. It stars Gary Olsen, Richard Ridings, Samantha Janus, Ralph Brown, Adrian Hood and Neil Morrissey.

== Plot ==
Up 'n' Under follows the story of an inept pub team from the 'Wheatsheaf Arms' in a rugby league sevens competition in Kingston upon Hull in England. Ex-pro Arthur's only passions in life are his wife and rugby league. When he hears about the 'Cobblers Arms' pub team and their corrupt manager, Arthur bets his life savings with Reg Welch that he can train any team to beat them.

However, the 'Wheatsheaf Arms' can only muster a side of five whose pride lies in their unbroken record of defeat. The pitifully unfit set of men have to accept the help of a coach, who just happens to be a woman. Hazel solidifies their resolve and raises questions of their character.

They have to struggle through adversity, come up triumphant and become a team. They are given a bye to the final of the competition where they have to play The Cobblers.

== Cast and characters ==
- Gary Olsen – Arthur
- Richard Ridings – Frank
- Samantha Janus – Hazel
- Ralph Brown – Phil
- Neil Morrissey – Steve
- Adrian Hood – Tommy
- David MacCreedy – Tony
- Tony Slattery – Reg Welch
- Brian Glover – Jack
- Griff Rhys Jones – Ray Mason
- Jane Clifford–Thornton – Doreen
- Susan Tully – June
- John Thomson – Stan
- Iain Rogerson – Ambulance Man
- Adam Fogerty – Wayne
- Ray Gravell – Referee

== Production ==
Samantha Janus gained two stone for the role which took her weight to eleven stone. She said that this made her "squirm" at the thought of having to appear naked in the film.

== Reception ==
The film grossed £3.45 million ($5.8 million) in the UK.
