= John de Borman =

British cinematographer

- Born: 14 December 1954 (age 71); Paris, France
- Years active: 1979–2022

John de Borman (born 1954 in Paris) is a French born British cinematographer.

== Filmography ==
=== Film ===
Year	Title	Director
1987	Medium Rare	Paul Madden
1988	Unmasked Part 25	Anders Palm
1989	Murder on Line One (Note: Also credited as executive producer)	Anders Palm
1991	Murder Blues	Anders Palm
1994	Death Machine	Stephen Norrington
1995	The Passion of Darkly Noon	Philip Ridley
1996	Small Faces	Gillies MacKinnon
1996	Trojan Eddie	Gillies MacKinnon
1997	The Full Monty	Peter Cattaneo
1997	Photographing Fairies	Nick Willing
1998	The Mighty	Peter Chelsom
1998	Hideous Kinky	Gillies MacKinnon
1999	Gregory's Two Girls	Bill Forsyth
2000	Saving Grace	Nigel Cole
2000	Hamlet	Michael Almereyda
2000	New Year's Day	Suri Krishnamma
2000	There's Only One Jimmy Grimble	John Hay
2001	Serendipity	Peter Chelsom
2002	The Guru	Daisy von Scherler Mayer
2002	Pure	Gillies MacKinnon
2004	Ella Enchanted	Tommy O'Haver
2004	Shall We Dance?	Peter Chelsom
2005	A Lot like Love	Nigel Cole
2005	Tara Road	Gillies MacKinnon
2006	Fade to Black	Oliver Parker
2008	Miss Pettigrew Lives for a Day	Bharat Nalluri
2008	Last Chance Harvey	Joel Hopkins
2009	An Education	Lone Scherfig
2010	Made in Dagenham	Nigel Cole
2011	Waterloo Sunset	John Duigan
2012	Quartet	Dustin Hoffman
2013	Half of a Yellow Sun	Biyi Bandele
2014	If I Stay	R. J. Cutler
2018	Slaughterhouse Rulez	Crispian Mills
2020	Pixie	Barnaby Thompson

Short film

Year	Title	Director	Notes
2001	The Glow	Marcus Dillistone	With Thierry Arbogast and Tony Pierce-Roberts
2013	A Dream of Flying	Georgina Chapman	

=== Television ===
TV movies

Year	Title	Director	Notes
1986	The Birth of Calculus	Glânffrwd P. Thomas	Documentary film; With Knut Steinerk
2015	Coalition	Alex Holmes	
2016	Do Not Disturb	Nigel Cole	

TV series

Year	Title	Director	Notes
1990	Beyond the Groove	Roger Pomphrey	
1995-1998	Screen Two	Chris Bould; Gillies MacKinnon	Episodes "Crazy for a Kiss" and "Small Faces"
2009	Cupid	Bharat Nalluri	Episode "Pilot"
2016	Indian Summers	Anand Tucker	3 episodes
2017	Will	Shekhar Kapur; Magnus Martens	3 episodes
2019	World on Fire	Thomas Napper	Episode 3
2021	Baptiste	Thomas Napper	2 episodes

Miniseries

Year	Title	Director	Notes
2006	Tsunami: The Aftermath	Bharat Nalluri	
2022	Why Didn't They Ask Evans?	Hugh Laurie	2 episodes
