= Hazel Vincent Wallace =

British theatre director (1919–2019)

Hazel Vincent Wallace OBE
- Born: Hazel Beatrice Wallace; 8 December 1919; Walsall, Staffordshire, England
- Died: 3 November 2019 (aged 99); London, England
- Education: University of Birmingham
- Occupations: Actor, theatre manager

Hazel Vincent Wallace OBE (born Hazel Beatrice Wallace; 8 December 1919 – 3 November 2019) was an actor and theatre manager who created the Thorndike Theatre in Leatherhead. She received an Order of the British Empire for her services to theatre in 1971. She was the first woman to build a new theatre in Britain.

== Early life ==
Hazel Beatrice Wallace was born on 8 December 1919 in Walsall, Staffordshire. Her father was a railway administrator and music teacher who was descended from William Vincent Wallace. During World War One he had been one of the first members of the Royal Flying Corps. Hazel had one sister, Marjorie, who would go on to work at the United Nations and be one of the first women ordained in the Anglican Communion.

Hazel attended Queen Mary's Grammar School in Walsall; she had planned to take up a place at Dartington Hall studying drama. When this was not possible, she instead studied social and political sciences at Birmingham University. After graduating in 1940, Wallace moved to Croydon to work in personnel management in a bell factory. In the evenings, she would go to the Unity Theatre in Camden where she acted, danced and sang on stage. This included taking the lead in a Ted Willis play. At the end of World War Two, she toured Europe with ENSA.

== Career as an actor-manager ==
Wallace joined Oscar Quitak's Under Thirty Theatre Group in 1946. The group produced plays in the West End on Sundays, and Wallace was involved in all aspects of production and co-founded the Buckstone Club, a membership club for actors. She became the director of the Under Thirty group.

In 1950, Wallace visited her older sister Majorie in New York. She stayed for seven months, and appeared on NBC in a variety of second leads as well as performing some plays.

The Under Thirty Theatre Group signed a lease on a theatre in Leatherhead and opened the Leatherhead Theatre Group in 1951. Wallace continued to act and direct plays as well as taking on the management of a weekly repertory theatre. Wallace decided not to form a permanent company but to attract actors from London and build the rest of the cast around them. Names she drew to the theatre included Vanessa Redgrave, Penelope Keith, and Richard Briers. Wallace also employed Alan Ayckbourn as an assistant stage manager and actor. By the middle of the 1960s, the weekly runs had become three-week runs, with every performance sold out.

== Building the Thorndike Theatre ==
In 1966, Wallace was approached by the owners of a cinema in Leatherhead that was due to be demolished for a new development of shops and offices. She suggested it could be redeveloped as a community arts centre and theatre. She rejected the contractors' designs for the new theatre complex as having a shallow stage, and inadequate spaces for both rehearsals and the public. She then worked with architect Roderick Ham to design a new theatre complex using the shell of the cinema. Wallace insisted that the theatre included a coffee bar, art gallery, restaurant and a studio theatre. This created an arts and community centre for the town. It was also the first theatre where all foyer areas and the whole auditorium is accessible for wheelchair users.

Wallace raised £220,000 in public donations to support the building costs. The remainder was contributed by the developers and the local authority. Wallace approached Dame Sybil Thorndike, who agreed to lend her name to the new theatre. The attached studio theatre was named the Casson, after Thorndike's actor husband Lewis Casson. The theatre opened on 17 September 1969, and was the site of Thorndike's final stage appearance the following month.

Wallace was the managing director of the theatre from 1969 until her retirement in 1980. She employed Carmen Silvera as her assistant director and casting director for five years.

== Later career ==
Wallace became the first woman to be conference chair at the Council of Repertory Theatres. She encouraged the use of the phrase "regional theatre" to replace "repertory". She also served as a member of Arts Council England's training committee. Wallace retired in 1980, but remained on the board of the Thorndike until it closed in the 1990s. She remained closely connected to the venue in its new form as the Leatherhead Theatre, and was guest of honour when Michael Caine became its new patron in 2012.

== Later life and death ==
Wallace moved to Denville Hall, a care home for the theatre profession, where she died on 3 November 2019.
