= Privates on Parade =

Play written by Peter Nichols

- West Yorkshire Playhouse production
- Original language: English
- Written by: Peter Nichols
- Subject: British army ENSA group after World War II
- Genre: Comedy
- Setting: 1948, South East Asia

Premiere
- Date: 17 February 1977
- Place: Aldwych Theatre; London

Privates on Parade: A Play with Songs in Two Acts is a 1977 farce by English playwright Peter Nichols (book and lyrics), with music by Denis King. The drama draws upon Nichols' own experiences in the real-life Combined Services Entertainment, the postwar successor to ENSA, Entertainments National Service Association. The play is noteworthy for, inter alia, a series of musical numbers, performed by the male lead, parodying the style of such performers as Noël Coward, Marlene Dietrich and Carmen Miranda.

== Plot ==
The play is set around the activities and exploits of the fictional Song and Dance Unit South East Asia (SADUSEA), a British military concert party stationed in Singapore and Malaya in the late 1940s during the Malayan Emergency.

== Productions ==
It was premiered at Stratford by the Royal Shakespeare Company, before receiving its London première at the Aldwych Theatre on 17 February 1977, where it ran for 208 performances. This production won the 1977 Laurence Olivier Award for Best New Comedy.

It was revived in 1979 at the Derby Playhouse and at York Theatre Royal, and again in 1982 with Bruce Payne as Flight Sergeant Kevin Cartwright and Tim Barlow; another revival was produced in 1989. A 2001 revival directed by Michael Grandage at the Donmar Warehouse had a cast including Roger Allam, James McAvoy, Malcolm Sinclair and Indira Varma, set design by Christopher Oram and choreography by Scarlett Mackmin. Allam received the 2002 Laurence Olivier Award for Best Actor for his performance.

In 2012 it was staged at the Noël Coward Theatre in London as the opening production of the first season of work from the newly formed Michael Grandage Company, with Simon Russell Beale in the lead.

== Original cast ==
- Charles Bishop - Tim Wylton
- Cheng - Richard Rees
- Corporal Len Bonny - Joe Melia
- Eric Young-Love - Simon Jones
- Kevin Cartwright - Ben Cross
- Lee - John Venning
- Major Giles Flack - Nigel Hawthorne
- Reg Drummond - David Daker
- Steven Flowers - Ian Gelder
- Sylvia Morgan - Emma Williams
- Terri Dennis - Denis Quilley

== Film adaptation ==
The play was adapted by Nichols and Handmade Films for a 1982 film with John Cleese and Denis Quilley, directed by Michael Blakemore.

== Awards and nominations ==
Awards

- 1977 Laurence Olivier Award for Best New Comedy
- 1990 New York Drama Critics' Circle Award for Best Foreign Play
- 1990 Drama Desk Award for Outstanding Featured Actor in a Play: Simon Jones
