= New Wolsey Theatre =

Theatre in Ipswich, England

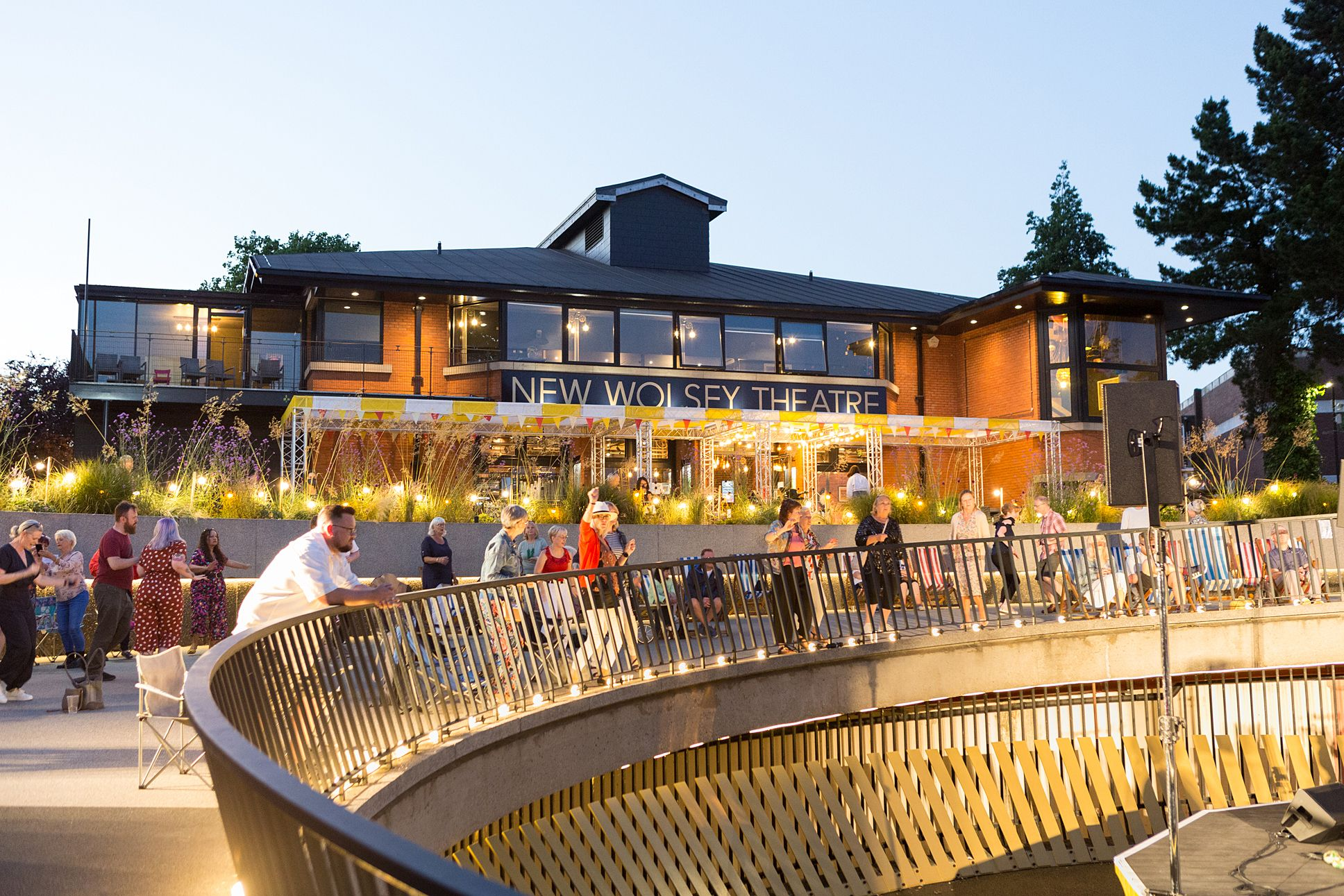
- The New Wolsey Theatre on Civic Drive, Ipswich
- Interactive map of New Wolsey Theatre
- Address: Civic Drive; Ipswich; UK
- Coordinates: 52.058749°N 1.148107°E
- Owner: New Wolsey Theatre Company Ltd
- Capacity: 400
- Current use: Producing and Receiving house
- Production: Beauty And The Beast

Construction
- Opened: 31 October 1979
- Rebuilt: Reopened 01 February 2001 after major refurbishment
- Architect: Roderick Ham

Website
- New Wolsey Theatre homepage

The New Wolsey Theatre is a producing theatre with a café & bar in Ipswich, Suffolk. It is a midsized regional theatre, with a seating capacity of 400.

== History ==
It replaced The Arts Theatre, the town's much loved and respected Repertory Theatre for many decades and was designed by Roderick Ham for Ipswich & Suffolk New Theatre Trust. Construction was carried out between 1977 and 1979 by Haymills Contractors Ltd with Carr And Angier theatre consultants providing planning advice and design/installation of all technical systems and equipment.

From 1979 to 1999 the theatre was operated by The Wolsey Theatre Company, a regional repertory company. The theatre was known for showing performances of drama, comedy and musical plays and was used almost exclusively as a producing house. Due to financial problems dating back to the mid 1990s, the operating company closed the theatre in 1999 and was dissolved.

In 2001, the theatre reopened and is owned and operated by the New Wolsey Theatre Company. The New Wolsey Theatre Company is a registered charity with a stated mission of presenting high quality, diverse and accessible work, and operates on a not-for-profit basis. The Theatre is now nationally recognised for the quality, diversity and reach of its productions, both as a producer, and in collaboration with a diverse range of visiting artists and companies from across the UK. It’s renowned for staging world premieres and landmark revivals of musicals including 20th Century Boy, It’s a Wonderful Life, Made in Dagenham, Never Lost At Home, Once, Our Blue Heaven, Sweet Charity, The Who’s Tommy (UK Theatre Award for Best Touring Production), Kinky Boots, Footloose and for its annual Rock ‘n’ Roll pantomime.

The Theatre has always been a champion of making performing arts accessible to all. As a founder member of the ground-breaking Ramps On The Moon, the New Wolsey Theatre was part of a consortium that strives to normalise the presence of deaf and disabled people on and off the stage and in 2017 the Theatre won the UK Theatre Award for the Promotion of Diversity.

== Productions ==
Since its reopening as a producing theatre, The New Wolsey has developed a house style of actor/musician productions - particularly through their Rock 'n' Roll Panto.

Notable productions have included:

- Reasons To Be Cheerful, produced with Graeae Theatre Company featuring the music of Ian Dury and The Blockheads - by Paul Sirett, directed by Jenny Sealey (2010)
- 20th Century Boy, a musical play based on the life of Marc Bolan and the music of T. Rex - by Peter Rowe, directed by Gary Lloyd (2012).
- Our House, a musical play featuring the songs of English ska band Madness - by Tim Firth, directed by Peter Rowe (2013).
- Made in Dagenham, a major revival of the musical in a co-production with Queen's Theatre Hornchurch directed by Douglas Rintoul (2016).
- Our Blue Heaven, a musical play based on Ipswich Town Football Club's 1978 FA Cup win - by Peter Rowe, directed by Peter Rowe (2018).
- The Snow Queen, a rock 'n' roll pantomime written and directed by Peter Rowe (2020).
- Jack and the Beanstalk, a rock 'n' roll pantomime written by Peter Rowe, directed by Kate Golledge (2021).
- Kinky Boots, based on the Miramax motion picture, the musical adaptation features a Tony-Award nominated book by Harvey Fierstein and Tony and Grammy award-winning music and lyrics by Cyndi Lauper.
- Dick Whittington and his Cat written by Vikki Stone and directed by Douglas Rintoul - nominated for UK Pantomime Award for Best Pantomime (under 500 seats) (2023).
- Footloose the Musical in a co-production with Pitlochry Festival Theatre (2024).

== Awards ==
- UK Theatre Awards 'Best Touring Production' award - TOMMY, directed by Kerry Michael (2017).
- UK Theatre Awards 'Promotion of Diversity' award (2017).
- UK Pantomime Association Awards 'Best Digital Pantomime' - Jack and the Beanstalk by Peter Rowe, directed by Kate Golledge (2022).
- UK Theatre Award for Most Welcoming Theatre (finalist) (2022)
- UK Pantomime Association Awards 'nomination for Best Pantomime (under 500 seats) for Dick Whittington and his Cat (2024).
- East Anglian Daily Times Award for Positive Impact in the Community (2024)
- East Anglian Daily Times Award for Suffolk Business of the Year (2024)
- BBC Suffolk Make a Difference Award (highly commended) (2024)
