= The Place of the Dead =

1997 British television film

- Written by: Jeff Pope
- Directed by: Suri Krishnamma
- Starring: Greg Wise; Simon Dutton; Dougray Scott
- Music by: Julian Nott
- Country of origin: United Kingdom
- Original language: English

Production
- Producers: Allison Malone; Jeff Pope; Simon Shaps
- Running time: 100 minutes
- Production company: LWT
- Budget: $2.6 million

Original release
- Network: ITV
- Release: 18 January 1997

The Place of the Dead is a 1997 television film directed by Suri Krishnamma and written by Jeff Pope. It is a 'true story' account of a British Army expedition in Malaysia that made headlines in 1994 when it went badly wrong. The expedition was to climb up Mount Kinabalu, the highest peak in Malaysia, and descend down the steep cliff faces on the other side into Low's Gully and then trek through the valley. The group of ten split up, with the fitter members of the team continuing on to keep to their rations and on the assumption that the less fit members had given up on the descent. The less able members meanwhile, carried on assuming that the fitter members were waiting for them.

== Plot ==
The film largely tells the story of the expedition itself, but occasionally flashes to the present where the members of expedition are giving evidence in a military court. The enquiry is to determine which members were at fault for the failure of the expedition, meaning that the story is told in flashback as the men remember it. Initially, the soldiers are shown training while a voiceover by expedition leader Lt. Col. Robert Neill (Simon Dutton) tells us that there will be five British Army soldiers, two Territorial Army soldiers and three Hong Kong Chinese soldiers on the expedition.

When the expedition starts, it becomes clear that the level of fitness among its members varies greatly. Lance Corporal Richard Mayfield (Dougray Scott), who is also the technical advisor on the expedition, expresses serious concern about the group's ability as a whole. Later that night, Neill feels that it is an appropriate time to "discuss things". Sergeant Bob Mann (Ralph Brown) suggests that the fitter members of the team continue on with the expedition as planned while the weaker members climb back down the mountain, drive to a village at the other end of the valley and work their way back up the river as a support group. Neill rejects the plan, leading to a confrontation between him and Mayfield.

The next day, Corporal Hugh Brittan (Greg Wise), Mayfield, Lance Corporal Steve Page (David Nellist) and Lance Corporal Peter Shearer (Phil McKee) make a head start. Brittan, now the most senior of the four soldiers, says that Neill wanted to use the morning as a resting period for the others. By nightfall, only Mann has caught up with the advance party. He explains that the rear party, now consisting of the supposed leaders of the expedition and three inexperienced Chinese soldiers, have already set up camp further down the mountain. Once again, Mayfield expresses serious concern, saying that "it's taken them fifteen hours to do a journey that took us three and they're still not here." He also highlighted how the rations had been carefully planned and wouldn't last if there were any more delays.

The next morning, Mayfield quickly climbs back down the mountain to where Neill, Major Ron Foster (John McArdle) and the three Chinese soldiers are camped to get permission from Neill to abseil into Low's Gully (which means going over 'The Point of No Return'). Neill agrees, but tells him to wait at the bottom. Mayfield protests, saying that he can only wait for a limited time. Exactly what happened in this conversation is left unclear. When Mayfield gets back to the top, Shearer makes it clear that he feels the advance party should wait. As the senior NCO, Brittan decides that if Mayfield wishes to abseil without the rear party, then they shouldn't wait.

After abseiling down, the advance party decide not to wait for their own safety and on the assumption that the rear party will not be able to abseil down. Shearer looks up at the cliff face with binoculars and finds the others but it isn't clear if they are moving up or down. Once again, he makes it clear that he wants them to wait but Mayfield claims that they must be going back up while Brittan says that "if they are coming down, we waste at least two days waiting for them to catch up. If they're going up, we waste if for nothing. I don't think we can take the risk."

Neill and Foster manage to get the Chinese soldiers down and into the gully, but find that the others haven't waited. Brittan leaves them a note saying 'The advance party wishes you a pleasant journey. Keep smiling!' This angers Neill and Foster. Tensions are also rising in the advance party, especially between Shearer and Brittan.

During an abseil, the rope becomes loose, causing Shearer to fall and badly injure his head. Fortunately, his legs aren't broken, meaning he can still walk. Nonetheless, the accident affects his strength and ability to continue. Mann also has an accident; when struggling through the undergrowth, he slips and badly cuts his hand on his machete. The cut becomes infected and starts to smell like "rotting meat". All members are becoming psychologically affected by the ordeal, something that isn't aided by the shortage of food.

By this point, Neill and his party have realised that they are trapped in the gully without Mayfield's technical expertise. They cannot continue without him, nor can they climb back up. They were running out of food and could only hope that someone had raised an alarm and was looking for them. However, Lance Corporal Yiu Keung 'Kevin' Cheung had been secretly conserving food in case of an emergency and gave some to Neill and Fostor.

Meanwhile, one morning Mayfield and Mann go on ahead but are told by Brittan to wait if they come to a fork in the track. When the other three reached a fork, they weren't to be seen. Mayfield and Mann claimed never to have seen a fork in the track.

Eventually, after much climbing, Brittan, Shearer and Paige reach the river and eventually make their way out of the valley, exhausted and hungry but glad to be alive. After ensuring that Shearer (who had also sustained an injury from a leech around his eye) was in hospital, Brittan and Page arrived at the hotel only to find that nobody else had booked in.

Back in the jungle, Mann is on the verge of a breakdown. Having recorded most of the ordeal on his video camera, he makes a goodbye message to his son Robert (he had previously named a waterfall after him) in a very emotional scene. Soon after Mayfield finds Mann lying on the floor on the verge of giving up, telling him that he has found a way out. The two men emerge into a village where they are given food and water. An elderly woman treats Mann's infected wound with a traditional herbal medicine which appears to completely and instantly cure it.

After they have been driven into town, Mayfield and Mann meet with Brittan and Page. Page angrily accuses them of abandoning an injured man "because you thought he'd hold you back". After Page leaves, Brittan explains to them that Neill had led his party into the gully after all and was now trapped in there. Nobody had raised the alarm however, as nobody knew they were missing. Neill hadn't even given a finishing date to the authorities. Brittan remembered that Neill had planned to stay close to the river throughout the expedition and advised the search and rescue teams of this. By flying the helicopter low and examining the river, the rear party are eventually found.

Back in the present, Neill openly accuses Brittan and Mayfield of condemning him to a "slow death by starvation". Mayfield counters this by saying Neill shouldn't have brought along the Chinese soldiers. Brittan stated that he made the right decision but for the wrong reasons: had he waited for them they'd all have become trapped and no one would have looked for them, resulting in all their deaths. However, he didn't know this when he made the decision.

The film concludes by stating that Neill and Foster were severely criticised and that their leadership had been "flawed and over-ambitious". Meanwhile, Corporal Brittan, Lance Corporal Mayfield and Lance Corporal Yiu Keung 'Kevin' Cheung all received commendations for their actions during the ordeal.

== Cast ==
- Greg Wise – Corporal Hugh Brittan
- Simon Dutton – Lt Colonel Robert Neill
- Dougray Scott – Lance Corporal Richard Mayfield
- John McArdle – Major Ron Foster
- Ralph Brown – Sgt Bob Mann
- David Nellist – Lance Corporal Steve Page
- Phil McKee – Lance Corporal Peter Shearer
- Craig Shai Hee – Lance Corporal Yiu Keung 'Kevin' Cheung
- Augustine Lau – Private Wai Keung
- Raymond Ong – Private Lam Wai Kee

== In popular culture ==
Peter Davey, a producer on the show, cited the jungle training for the production of this show in a 2006 interview as the inspiration for reality show I'm a Celebrity...Get Me Out of Here!.
