= Derby Theatre =

- Derby Playhouse (1975–2008)
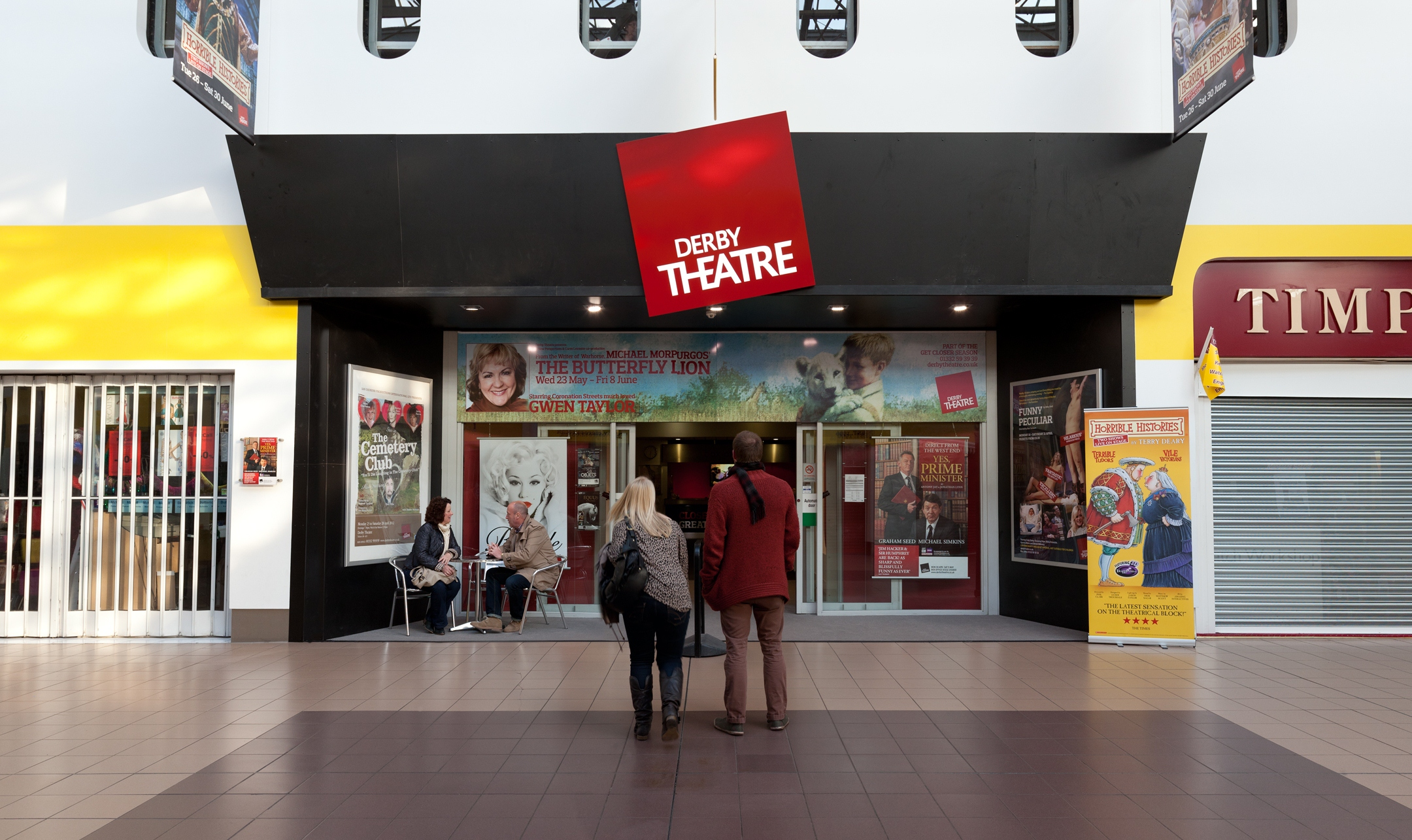
- Derby Theatre entrance viewed from Theatre Walk
- Interactive map of Derby Theatre
- Address: Derby; United Kingdom
- Coordinates: 52.92024°N 1.4715°W
- Owner: University of Derby
- Capacity: 535
- Type: Proscenium

Construction
- Opened: 1975; 51 years ago
- Architect: Roderick Ham

Website
- www.derbytheatre.co.uk

Derby Theatre is a theatre situated in Derby, England, located within the Derbion shopping centre. Formerly known as the Derby Playhouse, it was owned and run by Derby Playhouse Ltd from its opening in 1975 until 2008, when the company ceased operating after a period in administration. The theatre was reopened in 2009 as the Derby Theatre under the ownership of the University of Derby, who use it as a professional and learning theatre. In addition to the 531 seat main auditorium (originally 535 seats), the building contains a 110-seat studio theatre.

== History ==
Roderick Ham, who had already designed the Thorndike Theatre, Leatherhead, was commissioned to design the theatre, and the Derby City Council offered the site as part of the new shopping development, the Eagle Centre. It was officially opened as the Derby Playhouse on 20 September 1975 by the 11th Duke of Devonshire.

From its opening until October 2008, the theatre was owned and operated by Derby Playhouse Ltd. The company, which had a history going back to 1948, opened its first season in the new theatre with My Fair Lady, followed by Hamlet and concluding the following summer with Alan Bates in The Seagull. Serious financial difficulties emerged in 2007, and in October 2008, Derby Playhouse Ltd. ceased operating after a period in administration. The company's last production at the theatre was The Killing of Sister George starring Jenny Eclair.

The theatre was reopened in October 2009 as the Derby Theatre under the ownership of the University of Derby. The first two productions were by the Derby Gilbert & Sullivan Company who performed The Gondoliers and The Mikado. The University of Derby originally operated the venue in partnership with Derby LIVE, the city council's performing arts programme with the theatre used for both visiting professional companies and as a learning and community theatre. This partnership came to end in March 2012 when responsibility for all areas of the operation were returned to the university who operate the theatre with the support of the Arts Council England. In May 2012 it was confirmed that Derby Theatre would receive £923,000 over three years from the Arts Council England to support a Learning Theatre Pilot programme. The university also offered financial support of up to £500,000 per year from its Arts fund.

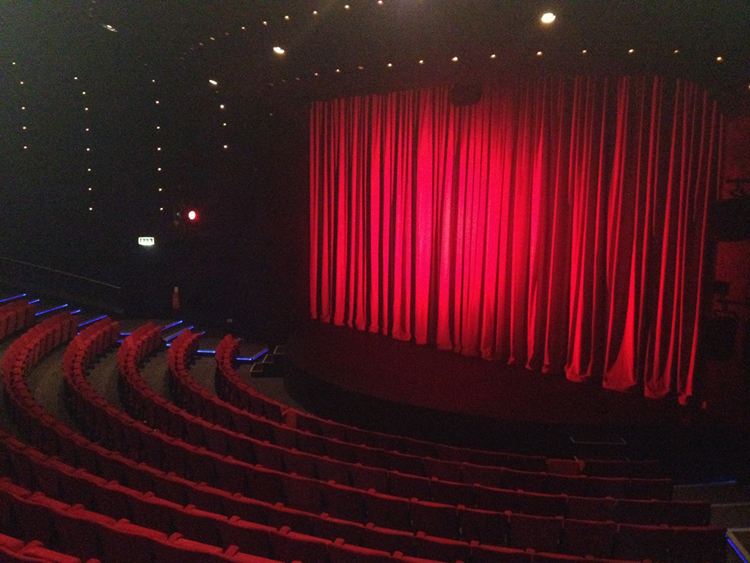
Auditorium after 2012 refurbishment

The theatre launched a fundraising campaign to help with restoration costs, and the main auditorium seating and carpets were refurbished in August 2012 in time for the autumn season. The old Arts College and Metro Cinema building on Green Lane (an historic building owned by the University of Derby) was restored and adapted for the theatre's use with spaces for rehearsals, prop storage, and the wardrobe department. The rehearsal spaces were opened in December 2012 by the theatre's newly appointed artistic director, Sarah Brigham; general manager, Gary Johnson; and vice-chancellor of the University of Derby, John Coyne.

In November 2013 it was announced that Esmée Fairbairn Foundation would be awarding a grant of £164,000 to the theatre to support the development of its work as a learning theatre and in particular to focus on supporting emerging artists, developing creative skills and working with community groups.

In October 2021 it was announced that Derby City Council was considering plans for the theatre to move to new premises on the site of former concert venue the Assembly Rooms, which had been out of action since a fire in 2014. A further announcement in July 2022 revealed that the City Council was applying for government funding for the project.

== Management ==
Former actor, Gary Johnson, was the Derby Theatre's general manager since its opening in 2009, until he left in November 2015. Sarah Brigham was appointed as the theatre's first resident artistic director in October 2012 to take up her post alongside Johnson in January 2013. Brigham later became both chief executive and artistic director. Brigham was previously the artistic director of The Point, Eastleigh and is a former associate director of the Dundee Repertory Theatre.

== Productions ==
The first season of works programmed by the venue itself (April – June 2012) included Yes, Prime Minister, Funny Peculiar, Horrible Histories and a co-production of The Butterfly Lion in association with New Perspectives Theatre Company and Curve Theatre. Autumn 2012 saw a number of productions including Radio Times, Three Men in a Boat, Driving Miss Daisy and The Haunting. The 2013 season featured productions of The Pitmen Painters, James and the Giant Peach and a new touring production of Birdsong. Since its re-opening, the theatre has staged an annual children's classic during the Christmas season. In 2012, it presented a musical theatre adaptation of Charlotte's Web in conjunction with The Birmingham Stage Company.

The first production commissioned and produced by the theatre under the artistic directorship of Sarah Brigham was Lee Hall's Cooking with Elvis which was directed by Mark Babych in May 2013. The first show directed by Sarah Brigham was Kes in September 2013 and featured former Skins actor Sam Jackson in his first stage role. Visiting productions included Go Back for Murder and September in the Rain and a co-production with the Mercury Theatre, Colchester of The Opinion Makers by Brian Mitchell and Joseph Nixon. The theatre teamed up with Birmingham Stage Company again to produce Horrible Histories Horrible Christmas in December 2013 which was directed by Phil Clark. The author Terry Deary attended the first preview performance, signed copies of his books and launched the Derby citywide Plus One scheme.

== Awards ==
In November 2013 the Theatre was recognised for its partnership with the University of Derby by winning the Excellence and Innovation in the Arts award at the 2013 THE Awards.

Blanche McIntyre won the award for Best Director for The Seagull, a co-production with Headlong, Nuffield, Southampton and Derby Theatre at the UK Theatre Awards 2013.
