= New Year's Day (2001 film) =

2001 film by Suri Krishnamma

- Directed by: Suri Krishnamma
- Written by: Ralph Brown
- Produced by: Simon Channing-Williams; Stephen Cleary
- Starring: Marianne Jean-Baptiste; Anastasia Hille; Andrew Lee Potts; Jacqueline Bisset
- Cinematography: John de Borman
- Edited by: Adam Ross
- Music by: Julian Nott
- Release date: 27 June 2001
- Country: United Kingdom
- Language: English

New Year's Day is a 2001 comedy-drama film starring Andrew Lee Potts, Bobby Barry, Jacqueline Bisset, Anastasia Hille, Michael Kitchen, Sue Johnston, Ralph Brown and Marianne Jean-Baptiste. It was written by Ralph Brown and directed by Suri Krishnamma.

The film follows two teenagers, Jake (Potts) and Steve (Barry) as they cope with life after being the sole survivors of an avalanche. Their teacher also survives the accident, but remains comatose and dies soon after the start of the film. The two boys make a suicide pact agreeing that on the first anniversary of the avalanche, they will kill themselves. The two spend their last year living life to the fullest. This takes the form of a list of "tasks", which they both must fulfill before dying.

The movie's screenplay is written by Brown, and deals with themes such as the generation gap, the conflicts that surround today's youngsters, suicide, crossing boundaries and how people are affected by tragedy. Brown has spoken of New Year's Day being prompted by the murder of James Bulger, in the sense of a storyline concerning two young people who are surrounded by grown-ups who have no idea about what they are doing.

New Year's Day won best film at the Raindance Film Festival 2001, and best film at the Sapporo Film Festival 2001. In February 2001, it also took the Grand Prize in the 12th Yubari International Fantastic Film Festival which was attended by director Suri Krishnamma.

The film contains a cover of the Tim Hardin song "Reason to Believe" by Paul Weller, recorded specially for the movie.

The exams scenes were filmed using students from the Queens School in Bushey, Hertfordshire. The school is located next door the ex American University where some of the school scenes were shot.

== See also ==
- List of films set around New Year
