= Iain Rogerson =

British actor

- Born: October 1960; Cefn Y Bedd Wrexham, Wales
- Died: 13 October 2017 (aged 57); Wrexham, Wales
- Occupation: Actor
- Years active: 1989–2011
- Known for: Role of Harry Flagg in Coronation Street (2002–2004)

Iain Rogerson (October 1960 – 13 October 2017) was a British actor, best known for his portrayal of Harry Flagg on ITV's Coronation Street between 2002 and 2004. His other television appearances included Emmerdale, Doctors, Casualty, The Bill, Heartbeat, Peak Practice, As Time Goes By, Hetty Wainthropp Investigates, Drop the Dead Donkey, Bloomin' Marvellous, and People Like Us.

Rogerson's film credits included Mack the Knife (1989), Up 'n' Under (1998), Whatever Happened to Harold Smith? (1999), Bedazzled (2000), Mike Bassett: England Manager (2001), To Kill A King (2003), and Kill Keith (2011). On stage, he worked extensively with John Godber and Hull Truck Theatre.

Rogerson died on 13 October 2017 in Wrexham Maelor Hospital from "complications" relating to diabetes. Later, a possible self-administered insulin overdose was suspected.
