= All Quiet on the Preston Front =

British television comedy-drama series (1994–1997)

- Also known as: Preston Front (series 2–3)
- Genre: Comedy
- Written by: Tim Firth
- Directed by: Brian Farnham
- Starring: Colin Buchanan; Caroline Catz; Alistair McGowan; Holly Grainger
- Theme music composer: Milltown Brothers
- Opening theme: "Here I Stand"
- Country of origin: United Kingdom
- Original language: English
- No. of series: 3
- No. of episodes: 19

Production
- Executive producers: Barry Hanson; Chris Parr; Julian Murphy
- Producer: Chris Griffin
- Production locations: Padiham and Hapton, Lancashire, England
- Running time: 50 and 40 minutes
- Production company: BBC Pebble Mill Productions

Original release
- Network: BBC1
- Release: 4 January 1994 – 8 September 1997

All Quiet on the Preston Front is a British comedy-drama television series broadcast on BBC One from 4 January 1994 to 8 September 1997. Created by Tim Firth, it follows a group of friends in the fictional Lancashire town of Roker Bridge, whose lives are linked by service in a Territorial Army platoon. The first series used the full title, All Quiet on the Preston Front. For the second and third series, the title was shortened to Preston Front.

== Plot ==
Set in the fictional Lancashire town of Roker Bridge, the series follows the lives of a group of young adults whose membership in the local Territorial Army (TA) platoon serves as a common thread. Initially, TA enlistment acts as the vehicle that brings the individuals together, but as the narrative unfolds over the three series, the focus shifts towards their personal challenges and relationships.

Central to the storyline is Hodge, an affable yet directionless character who grapples with romantic complications. His friend Eric acts as a counterpoint, more introspective and grounded, and together they shape the group’s dynamic. Dawn, a trainee teacher, navigates professional development alongside personal growth, while Lloydy brings a more light-hearted presence. Spock is defined by his commitment to the TA and his ambition to become a good teacher, while Diesel offers a working-class perspective on the group’s experiences.

== Principal characters ==
- Private David "Hodge" Gadd, a garden centre assistant (Colin Buchanan)
- Private Wayne "Eric" Disley, Hodge's best friend, an underachieving delivery driver (Paul Haigh)
- Private Dawn Lomax, a trainee teacher and new recruit to the transport section, Eric's girlfriend (later wife) (Caroline Catz)
- Private Simon "Spock" Matlock, a history teacher and intellectual (Stephen Tompkinson in series one, Alistair McGowan thereafter)
- Private Tony "Lloydy" Lloyd, a farm labourer (later wealthy after inventing a successful board game), the platoon comic figure (Adrian Hood)
- Private (later Lance-Corporal) Derek "Diesel" Moyle, a garage owner (Tony Marshall)
- Corporal (later Officer Cadet) Alison Minshull, NCO in charge of the transport section, Spock's sister, unhappily married to a local solicitor (Kate Gartside)
- Corporal (later Sergeant) Peter Polson, the friends' section commander, a former regular NCO, now manager of a hotel leisure centre (David MacCreedy)
- Jeanetta Scarry, an older woman with whom Hodge had a one-night stand five years earlier (Susan Wooldridge in series one and two, Carolyn Pickles thereafter)
- Kirsty, the young daughter of Jeanetta and Hodge (Holly Grainger)
- Lieutenant Carl Rundle, the platoon commander, a junior hotel manager, in love with Ally (Keiran Flynn)
- Laura Delooze, a singer and waitress and Hodge's girlfriend in the first two series (Lucy Akhurst)
- Peter Wang, owner of the local Chinese restaurant (Ozzie Yue)
- Melanie Polson, Polson's younger sister, later Hodge's girlfriend (Angela Lonsdale; series three only)
- Mrs Ruddock, owner of the garden centre where Hodge works (Matyelok Gibbs; series one and three)
- Declan Caine, a plastic surgeon, later Jeanetta's boyfriend (Oliver Cotton; series three only)

=== Guest stars and Cameos ===
- Freddie Davies – Heron Man
- Nicky Henson – Greg Scarry
- Keith Allen – Dave the Executive
- Tracy Shaw – Server in McDonald's
- Mark Benton – Roaming Hands Richard
- Stirling Moss, Nick Owen and Samantha Fox appeared as themselves

== Seasons and Episodes ==
=== Series One (1994) ===
The opening series introduces the cast and setting of Roker Bridge, framed around their everyday lives linked by service in the TA. The military element provides a backdrop for the humour, while everyday issues such as first romances, job struggles and small-town life form the heart of the narrative.

Episodes

1. "Hodge's Girlfriend" (4 January 1994); director: Brian Farnham
2. "Ally's Husband" (11 January 1994); director: Brian Farnham
3. "Eric's Job" (18 January 1994); director: Brian Farnham
4. "Lloydy's Fish" (25 January 1994); director: Brian Farnham
5. "Diesel's Garage" (1 February 1994); director: Brian Farnham
6. "Kirsty's Biscuit" (8 February 1994); director: Brian Farnham

=== Series Two (1995) ===
For the second series, the title was shortened to Preston Front, reflecting a shift in focus away from the TA. The series deepens characterisation and explores the lives of some of the supporting cast while maintaining its gentle, observational humour.

Episodes

1. "Dawn's Ball" (16 July 1995); director: Marcus Mortimer
2. "Laura's Mousse" (23 July 1995); director: Marcus Mortimer
3. "Spock's Leg" (30 July 1995); director: Marcus Mortimer
4. "Polson's Lilo" (6 August 1995); director: Betsan Morris Evans
5. "Diesel's Out of Body Experience" (13 August 1995); director: Betsan Morris Evans
6. "Lloydy's Ark" (27 August 1995); director: Betsan Morris Evans

=== Series Three (1997) ===
The final series marks a shift in both tone and theme. With significantly less focus on the military backdrop, the narrative centres on the complexities of the characters' lives as they face issues like career changes, relationship breakdowns and personal ambitions. The comedy adopts a more mature, reflective quality, providing a nuanced portrayal of friendship. Episodes in the third series are 10 minutes shorter than those in the first and second series.

Episodes

1. "Hodge's Driving Test" (21 July 1997); director: Chris Bernard
2. "Eric's Won Ton" (28 July 1997); director: Chris Bernard
3. "Lloydy's House Warming" (4 August 1997); director: Chris Bernard
4. "Spock's Dilated Pupil" (11 August 1997); director: Chris Bernard
5. "Polson's Mess" (18 August 1997); director: Rick Stroud
6. "Diesel's Ostrich" (1 September 1997); director: Rick Stroud
7. "Jeanetta's Marijuana" (8 September 1997); director: Rick Stroud

== Locations ==
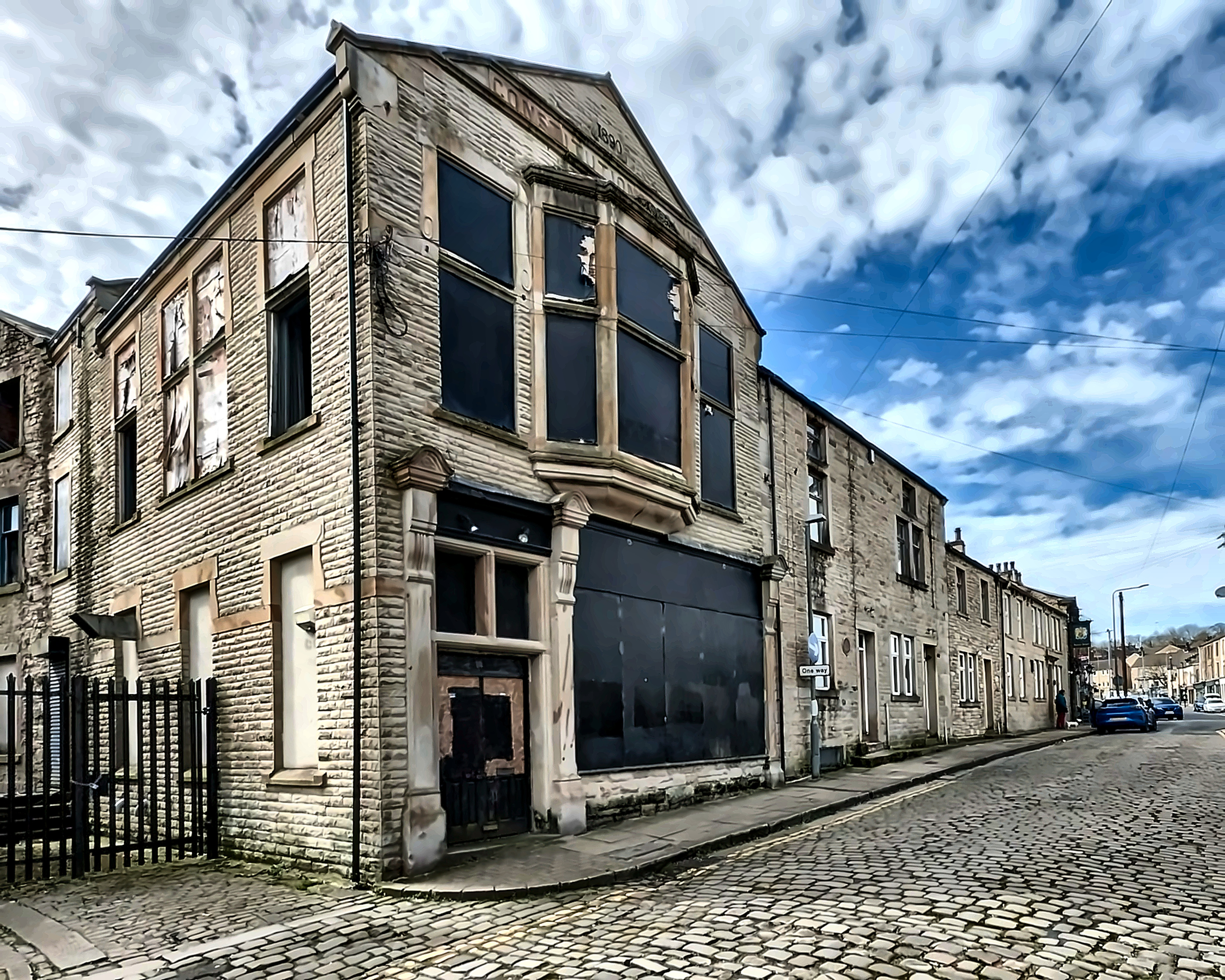
Mill Street, location of the Roman Holiday Chinese restaurant

The series is mainly set in Lancashire, with various local locations used. Key filming took place on Mill Street in Padiham on Mill Street and on Manchester Road in Hapton, both of which stood in for the fictional town of Roker Bridge. Mill Street was prominently featured as the town centre, including the exterior of Peter Wang’s Chinese restaurant, the Roman Holiday.

The scenes set at the TA centre were filmed on Bury Road, Haslingden and the site is still used as an Army Cadet Centre. The former RAF Laarbruch in Germany was used for the series one episode "Kirsty's Biscuit" and the Black Country Museum in Dudley appeared in the series two episode "Spock's Leg".

== Theme Music ==
The theme music was a re-recorded version of "Here I Stand" by Milltown Brothers, as an instrumental for the opening sequence and the full version with lyrics during the end credits.

== Reception ==
Contemporary reviews of All Quiet on the Preston Front were generally positive, with critics praising Tim Firth’s understated writing and the series’ blend of humour and pathos. In The Independent, Thomas Sutcliffe described it as a “gentle comedy” that “combines a tenderness about the little troubles of life with a fine and funny script”, highlighting its distinctly Northern tone and character-driven wit. Other contemporary coverage noted the strength of the ensemble cast and the series’ balance of comedy and drama, though some critics found the dialogue occasionally over-crafted. The programme’s reception was reflected in its later awards success, including recognition at the British Comedy Awards and a nomination at the British Academy Television Awards.

== Awards and nominations ==
Wins

- Best Comedy Drama, British Comedy Awards
- Best Series, Royal Television Society (RTS) Awards
- Best Series, San Francisco Television Festival
- Best Original Drama Series, Writers' Guild of Great Britain
- Best Drama Series, RTS Midlands

Nominations

- Best Series, British Academy Television Awards (BAFTA)
- British Comedy Awards (additional nominations)

== Books ==
In 1997, to coincide with the broadcast of Series 3, two tie-in novels were published by Chameleon Books, both written by Ed Jones. The first, Liberty, Equality and Virginity, is a prequel set in 1989, five years prior to the events of the television series and focuses on Hodge's affair with Jeanetta. The second, Preston Front: Ostriches and Marijuana is a novelisation of the third series and adds that Laura is pregnant by Greg.

- Liberty, Equality, Virginity – ISBN 978-0-233-99107-8
- Preston Front: Ostriches and Marijuana – ISBN 978-0-233-99109-2
