= Dracula (1995 play) =

Play by John Godber and Jane Thornton

- Written by: Jane Thornton; John Godber
- Based on: Dracula by Bram Stoker
- Original language: English
- Subject: The Transylvanian Count Dracula has arrived in England
- Genre: Drama/horror

Premiere
- Date premiered: 25 October 1995
- Place premiered: Hull Truck Theatre; Kingston upon Hull

Dracula is a 1995 stage adaptation co-authored and by John Godber and Jane Thornton from Bram Stoker's 1897 novel of the same title. Its world premier was at the Spring Street Theatre, home of Hull Truck Theatre at Kingston upon Hull, East Riding of Yorkshire.
