= Thorndike Theatre =

Leatherhead Theatre
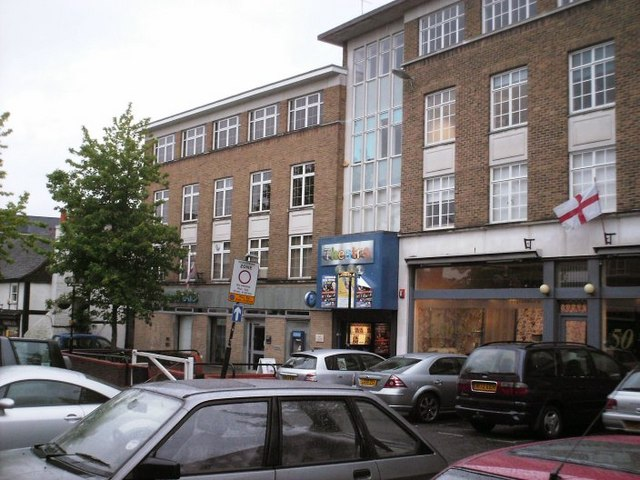
- Leatherhead Theatre

- Location within Surrey
- Former names: Thorndike Theatre
- Location: Church Street, Leatherhead, Surrey
- Coordinates: 51°17′42″N 0°19′43″W
- Capacity: 495 + 3 wheelchairs
- Type: Theatre

Construction
- Built: 1967–1969
- Opened: 17 September 1969
- Architect: Roderick Ham

Website
- www.theleatherheadtheatre.com

Listed Building – Grade II
- Official name: Thorndike Theatre
- Designated: 8 July 1988
- Reference no.: 1028904

The Thorndike Theatre, now known as the Leatherhead Theatre, is a Grade II listed building in Leatherhead, Surrey, England. Roderick Ham designed the theatre for Hazel Vincent Wallace within the shell of the disused 1930s Crescent Cinema. Named after Dame Sybil Thorndike, the theatre was opened on 17 September 1969 by Princess Margaret.

The theatre closed in 1997 after the loss of public funding. A charitable trust was set up to operate it and the theatre re-opened as the Leatherhead Theatre in 2001, with seating reduced to 495 plus three wheelchair places.

== History ==
The Thorndike Theatre opened in 1969 as a replacement for the 300-seat Ace Cinema in Leatherhead High Street. The cinema had originally been built in 1890 as the Victoria Hall. Hazel Vincent Wallace had started the Leatherhead Theatre Group there, attracting West End stars for three week runs. As performances became more popular, Wallace found its size had become restrictive and there was a need for a new and better-equipped performing arts venue in the town.

The Thorndike Theatre, in Church Street, was designed by Roderick Ham in the modernist style. It was rebuilt from the former Crescent Cinema, which was originally constructed in 1939 and which was run by a local family until the 1960s. Although the exterior walls of the Crescent were retained, the interior, including the 526-seat auditorium and lobby, was built anew. Wallace approached actor Sybil Thorndike who agreed to have her name on the new theatre. Wallace also raised the majority of the construction costs through public appeals, with some additional funding from the Leatherhead Urban District Council and the Arts Council. The building also included a studio theatre, the Casson Room, for smaller-scale performances including youth productions. The Thorndike Theatre was opened in September 1969 by Princess Margaret.

Although it was initially popular, the Thorndike Theatre regularly ran operating deficits. Following several years of cuts in public subsidy, it launched an appeal for £350,000 in February 1988, which was supported by the playwright, Alan Ayckbourn, actors, Prunella Scales and Timothy West, and the local MP, Kenneth Baker. The theatre briefly closed in July 1990, but reopened three months later following a rescue bid led by the producer and businessman, Bill Kenwright. It closed again in April 1997 with a total debt of almost £1.2 million. A second reopening followed in October 1997, but closed just over a month later after the new operators, Screenworks, entered voluntary liquidation owing £400,000.

The theatre was Grade II-listed in July 1999. It reopened in 2001 as a part-time theatre, cinema, community space and meeting place for the evangelical group, Pioneer People. The annual Leatherhead Drama Festival, for amateur theatre groups, was launched at the theatre in 2004 and ran for 16 years.

== Bibliography ==
- Turnbull, Olivia (2008). Bringing Down the House: The Crisis in Britain's Regional Theatres. Bristol: Intellect Books. ISBN 978-1-84-150208-3.
- Vardey, Edwina, ed. (1988). History of Leatherhead : a town at the crossroads. Leatherhead: Leatherhead and District Local History Society. ISBN 978-0-95-060091-8.
- Vardey, Edwina (2001). Leatherhead: A history. Chichester: Phillimore. ISBN 1-86077-189-0.
