= Derby Gilbert & Sullivan Company =

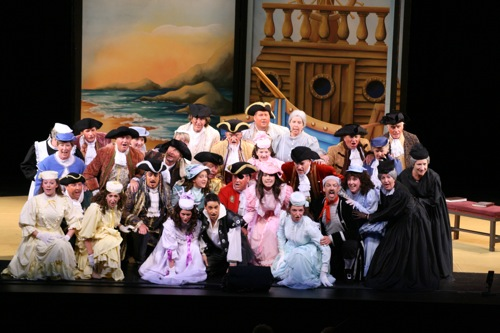
DGSC perform Pirates in Canada, 2007.

Derby Gilbert & Sullivan Company, based in Derby, England, produced the works of Gilbert and Sullivan from 1966 to 2018. The company won the amateur competition at the International Gilbert and Sullivan Festival an unprecedented six times and was called "one of the most highly acclaimed nonprofessional theatre companies in the UK". The company also won awards from the Waterford International Festival of Light Opera.

The company usually mounted one or two productions each year, with orchestra, performing for a week in Derby, and one performance at the G&S Festival in Buxton, England along with various concert performances. They also performed in Philadelphia, Pennsylvania, Gettysburg, Pennsylvania and Seattle, Washington in the US, in Lanzarote, Spain and in Nanaimo, British Columbia, Canada.

== History ==
=== Origins and early years ===
The roots of Derby Gilbert & Sullivan Company reach back to the 1940s when in Spondon, a parish village on the outskirts of Derby, a choral group was started by the local school headmaster – Spondon Choral Union. This choir sang both secular and religious music and performed in local and national music festivals. After the headmaster retired, the choir continued under the leadership of several conductors and subsequently was renamed as Spondon Musical Society.

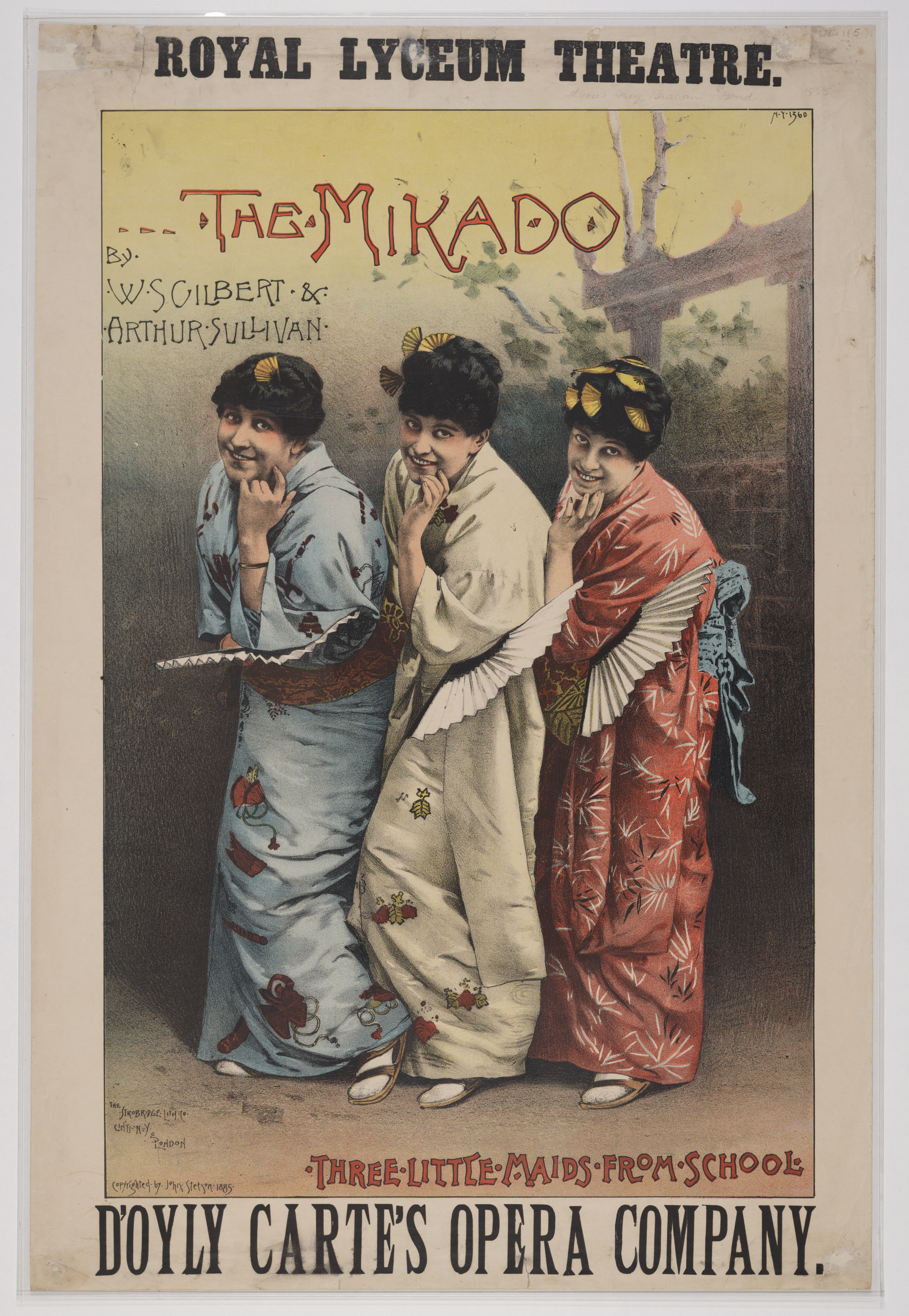
The Mikado was the company's first show at The Derby Playhouse

The choir's musical style changed in 1966 when a concert version of "Trial by Jury", conducted by Andrew Nicklin, proved so popular that the decision was taken to try out a full production of "H.M.S. Pinafore" in the school hall in 1967. The success of this production initiated a series of yearly Gilbert and Sullivan productions in Spondon, which continued for the next dozen years until the society outgrew the potential of the school hall. In 1980, the society moved to The Derby Playhouse, where its first production, "The Mikado", received such a favourable response that they changed their name to Derby Gilbert & Sullivan Company to more clearly reflect the new city base and repertoire of the company.

In the 1980s, the company played a couple of 'guest weeks' at the Buxton Opera House with "The Mikado" and later "The Yeomen of the Guard". Under the direction of co-founder Andrew Nicklin, the company began to build a reputation for presenting updated, or "non-traditional" G&S productions.

=== Competitive successes ===
Under Nicklin, the company took The Mikado to The International Gilbert and Sullivan Festival in Buxton, England, in 1996, the company's first appearance there. The production had a modern theme and setting that earned the company an "Adjudicator's Special Award" for innovation. The next year, the company's production of Princess Ida won the Derby Playhouse Eagle award for Best Amateur Musical seen by the adjudicators in and around the city during the 1997 season. Then the company presented this production at the G&S festival at its Philadelphia, Pennsylvania venue. The production was adjudicated the Festival Winner, and several of the performers won individual awards, including Deborah Norman for Best Female Voice and Nicklin for Best Amateur Producer.

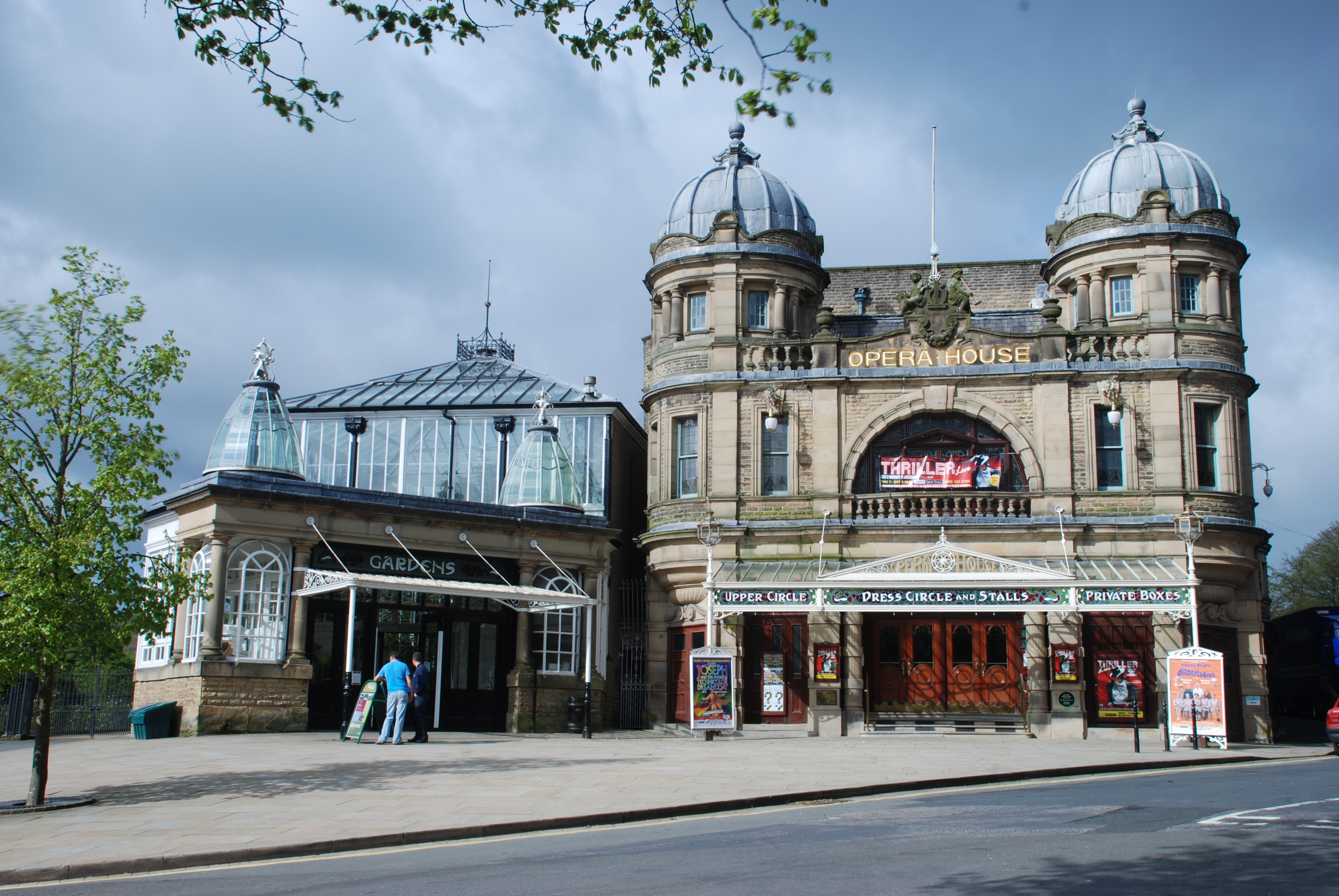
Buxton Opera House, where the company won at the G&S Festival six times

At the 1998 festival at Buxton, the company continued to earn awards, as its production of The Pirates of Penzance received the 2nd Runners-up prize. In 1999, the company was again the Festival Winner at the International G&S Festival with their production of The Yeomen of the Guard. The company's individual performers also won awards for Best Male Performer (Stephen Godward), Best Female Performer (Elizabeth Watkins) and Best Supporting Actor (Simon Theobald), with the production team being awarded Best Musical Director (Christine Nicklin) and Best Amateur Producer (Andrew Nicklin). Other members of the company won awards for other performances including Best Male Voice (Nick Sales) and Best Female Voice (Debbie Norman), both with another Nicklin-directed company, Trent Opera, which staged 'Utopia Ltd futuristically set in Star Wars style.

2000 was another top award winning year for the company, as its production of Iolanthe was the Festival Winner at the 7th International G&S Festival. Other prizes won by the company were Best Animated Chorus and Best Producer for Andrew Nicklin. The Mikado in 2001 placed 2nd Runners-up, and individual prizes went to company members Patrick Dawson, for Best Male Performer, Stephen Godward, for Best Male Voice and to the chorus for Best Chorus, as well as nominations in most categories.

=== 2002–2008 ===
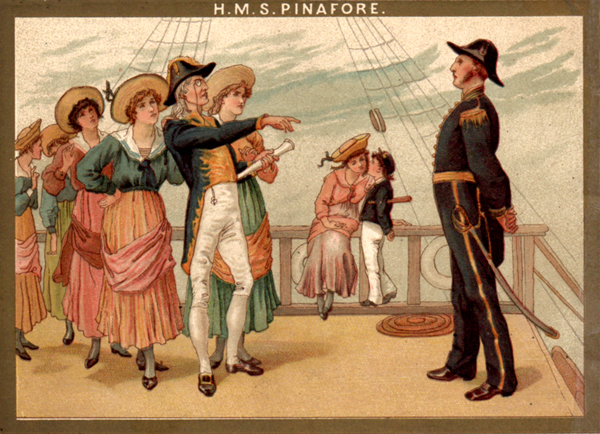
The company took its production of H.M.S. Pinafore to Canada; Pinafore was also the company's first full-length show.

In 2002 the Company appointed a new president, Glyn Hepworth, who initiated the company's popular "Dinner and Operetta Evenings". The company mounted The Gondoliers in the spring. In the summer, the company flew to Seattle, Washington, where they were hosted by the Seattle Gilbert & Sullivan Society in three performances of Iolanthe. The Seattle Post-Intelligencer's review commented that the company's "lively production was ... a delight to ... the appreciative audience. ... Although all this company is amateur, it has fielded some excellent voices that are well-suited to G & S; the choruses of peers and fairies sang richly and so clearly nearly every word was audible. Less than two weeks after their return to the UK, the company performed The Gondoliers on the Awards Night of the International G&S Festival at the Buxton Opera House.

In 2003, the company's production of Ruddigore was Festival Winner, the company's 4th top win. The following year, the company ended its 23-year relationship with the Derby Playhouse and moved its production of H.M.S. Pinafore to the Derby Assembly Rooms Darwin Suite, a much smaller "black box" space with fewer technical capabilities. Nevertheless, it placed 2nd Runners-up at the International G&S Festival. In both 2005 and 2006, the company again was Festival Winner, with Andrew Nicklin's productions of The Sorcerer and Pirates. The company's six wins at the Festival were unprecedented. The company also took The Sorcerer to the Waterford Festival of Light Opera, where it won the awards for Best G&S Opera, Best G&S Director and Best Chorus, and Stephen Godward won Best Male Singer for his performance as Dr. Daly. In 2005, the company also took its 2004 production of Pinafore to Nanaimo on Vancouver Island in British Columbia, Canada. As with all of the company's transatlantic trips, the cast, and in this case also the technical staff, paid their own airfare and accommodation. Nevertheless, the company enjoyed the experience so much that they went again to Nanaimo in 2007, taking two productions, Nicklin's Iolanthe and Pirates.

In 2008, the company were invited to perform in the Victorian Theatre within Chatsworth House, where it gave three performances of 'Pirates. They were invited to return to Chatsworth in 2009 and beyond.

=== Later years and closure ===
The Derby Playhouse reopened as the Derby Theatre in 2009, and Derby G&S Company were invited to stage its The Gondoliers and The Mikado as the first productions on the newly opened stage. A review of The Gondoliers in This is Derbyshire called the company "one of the most respected companies in the city ... this is a group that has performed successfully both at home and abroad and has won the International Gilbert and Sullivan Festival no less than six times. ... The Gondoliers was a thoroughly enjoyable show, ably marshalled by Andrew Nicklin, who has an enviable reputation for staging quality productions."

In 2010, the company made another trans-Atlantic trip to take part in a Gettysburg, Pennsylvania, leg of the International G&S Festival with its Mikado. It also performed The Mikado in Buxton in 2010 and Princess Ida in 2011, in both cases being ranked as the first runner-up. The company also performed as part of the London Concert Chorus by invitation of Raymond Gubbay, conducted by Richard Balcombe, with impressionist Alistair McGowan who also appeared in Derby as the title character in The Mikado in 2011.

The company closed in 2018.
