= David MacCreedy =

English actor, director, and film producer

- Born: 11 February 1969 (age 57); Workington, England
- Occupation: Actor
- Years active: 1990–present
- Television: All Quiet on the Preston Front

David MacCreedy (born 11 February 1969) is an English film, television and theatre actor, as well as being a director and film producer. He is best known for his role as Corporal Pete Polson in the TV series All Quiet on the Preston Front and for playing Tony in the rugby film Up 'n' Under.

== Career ==
=== Television ===
Whilst at drama school, MacCreedy was in the Territorial Army (now the Army Reserve), which helped with his audition for Corporal Polson in All Quiet on the Preston Front. He initially auditioned with Stephen Tompkinson, whom he already knew, and they worked together to secure the roles on the programme.

=== Director ===
MacCreedy filmed, produced and directed a film about the South Atlantic Medal Association visit to the Falkland Islands in November 2002. The event was filmed almost 20 years after the Falklands War.

== Personal life ==
MacCreedy was born and raised in Workington, Cumbria, England. His parents still live in the town. He has a daughter, Ellie MacCreedy and a son, Charlie MacCreedy.

He was at drama college with Philip Glenister, Rufus Sewell and James Nesbitt. He appeared alongside Nesbitt in an episode of Murphy's Law.

== Filmography ==
Year	Title	Role	Notes
1992	A Time to Dance	David Kennedy	3 Episodes
1992	Rumpole of the Bailey	'Snouty' Smedley	Episode; Rumpole and the Reform of Joby Jonson
1993	Spender	Brian	Episode; Best Friends
1994–1997	All Quiet on the Preston Front	Corporal/Sergeant Pete Polson	19 Episodes
1995	Heartbeat	Dave	Episode; It's All in the Game
1997	A Dance to the Music of Time	Bracey	Episode; The Thirties
1998	Up 'n' Under	Tony	Film
1999	Bostock's Cup	Mick Wallace	
2000	Life Force	Sergeant	
2001	The Bill	Gary Hughes	Episodes; Britanniamania (I & III)
2002	Breeze Block	Stairmonster	
2003	EastEnders	Alex	2 Episodes
2005	Dalziel and Pascoe	Saul Axton	Episode: "Dead Meat"
2005	Kinky Boots	Heckler	Film
2005	Murphy's Law	Anstiss	Episode; Extra Mile
2006	Longford	Journalist number 2	TV film
2008	Heartbeat	Mick	Episode; It Came From Outer Space
2009	Inspector George Gently	Lilley's Clark	Episode: "Gently Through the Mill"
2011	Shameless (British TV series)	Neil	Series 8 Episode 15 "My Name Is Avril"
2014-2015	The Full Monty	Alan, Alf, Reg	Theatre tour
2016	DCI Banks	Mark Rundle	Episode: "A Little Bit of Heart"
