= Moon Landing (music drama) =

- Music: Stephen Edwards
- Lyrics: Stephen Edwards
- Book: Stephen Edwards
- Productions: 2007 Derby Playhouse

Moon Landing is a musical with book, lyrics and music by Stephen Edwards. The story, from an original idea and synopsis by Justin Fleming, is based on the American Space Race and the Apollo 11 spaceflight which on July 20, 1969 landed the first humans on the Moon and is seen through the eyes of Buzz Aldrin, the second man to walk on the Moon.

Glenn Carter as Buzz Aldrin led the cast of the original production, as first presented at the Derby Playhouse, UK in October, 2007. In 2008, the play was nominated for a TMA award for "Best Musical Production".

== Musical numbers ==
Act I

- Moon Shot – Company
- Our President Is Totally Nuts – Grissom, Shepherd & Slayton
- Beheld By The Gods – Astronauts
- Thrilled, Proud and Pleased – Jan, Joan, Pat & Betty
- The Sea Of Destiny – Buzz Aldrin & Goddess Of The Moon
- A Monkey Could Perform This Role – Joan & Buzz Aldrin
- Path Of The Gods – Slayton & Company
- Me and My Friend Grissom – Slayton, Betty Grissom & Company
- The Far Side Of The Moon – Mike Collins
- My Reward Will Be Regret – Joan Aldrin
- The Coast of Destiny – Buzz Aldrin
- We Crashed Into The Moon – Aldrin, Collins & Armstrong
- I Promise – Collinses, Armstrongs, Aldrins & Slayton
- The Launch – Company

Act II

- What Was It Like? – Journalists, Astronauts, Wives
- Mystery Creates Wonder – Neil Armstrong
- What Will You Do For An Encore? – Nixons, Collinses, Armstrongs & Aldrins
- That One Wonderful Moment – Buzz Aldrin
- The Most Hated Man In History – Pat Collins & Nixon
- The Landing, Part 1 – Mission Control, Crew & Wives
- The Landing, Part 2 – Armstrong, Aldrin & Company
- The Melancholy of All Things Done– Dr Sparks and Buzz Aldrin
