= Happy Families (play) =

Play written by John Godber

Happy Families is a play written by John Godber in 1991.

It is an autobiographical play set in Northern England in 1978 and tells the story of a boy called John and his parents Vic and Dot. It recounts the stresses and strains of growing up with his family throughout his teenage years. Other characters within the play include Jack and Liz (John's grandparents), Doris and Edna (John's Aunties) and Rebecca (Edna's Daughter). It is a memory play and the narrative jumps back and forth from when John was about 9 until when he graduates with a degree as a drama teacher. John Godber has described it as "humour with a touch of sadness".

It takes its name from the card game of the same name - Happy Families.
