= Up 'n' Under =

1984 comedy by John Godber

- Original language: English
- Written by: John Godber
- Series: Up 'n' Under II
- Subject: An amateur rugby team with an unbroken record of defeat accept the help of a female coach
- Genre: Comedy
- Setting: Wheatsheaf Arms pub in the North of England

Premiere
- Date: 1984
- Place: Hull Truck Theatre; Kingston upon Hull, England

Up 'n' Under is a comedy by English playwright John Godber, first staged at the Hull Truck Theatre in 1984. It won The Laurence Olivier Award for Best New Comedy that same year. The sequel, Up 'n' Under II, followed in 1985.

== Plot ==
It followed the story of an inept pub team from the Wheatsheaf Arms pub in a rugby league sevens competition in Kingston upon Hull in England. Ex-pro Arthur's only passions in life are his wife and rugby league. When he hears about the 'Cobblers Arms' pub team and their corrupt manager, Arthur bets his life savings with Reg Welch that he can train any team to beat them.

However, the 'Wheatsheaf Arms' can only muster a side of four whose pride lies in their unbroken record of defeat. The pitifully unfit set of men have to accept the help of a coach, who just happens to be a woman.

They have to struggle through adversity, come up triumphant and become a team. They are given a bye to the final of the competition where they have to play The Cobblers.

== Up 'n' Under II ==
The sequel to the original play is centred on the return match between the amateur rugby league team from the 'Wheatsheaf Arms' and the 'Cobblers Arms'.

== Film adaptation ==
Godber scripted and directed the film adaptation in 1997 with Samantha Janus, Gary Olsen, Ralph Brown, Neil Morrissey, Richard Ridings, Tony Slattery, Brian Glover, David MacCreedy, Griff Rhys Jones, John Thomson, Susan Tully, and Iain Rogerson. The film was shot in Cardiff, Wales.

== Rugby union adaptation ==
In 2011, Godber adapted the play to follow an amateur rugby union sevens side with the setting moved to South Wales.
