= Derbion =

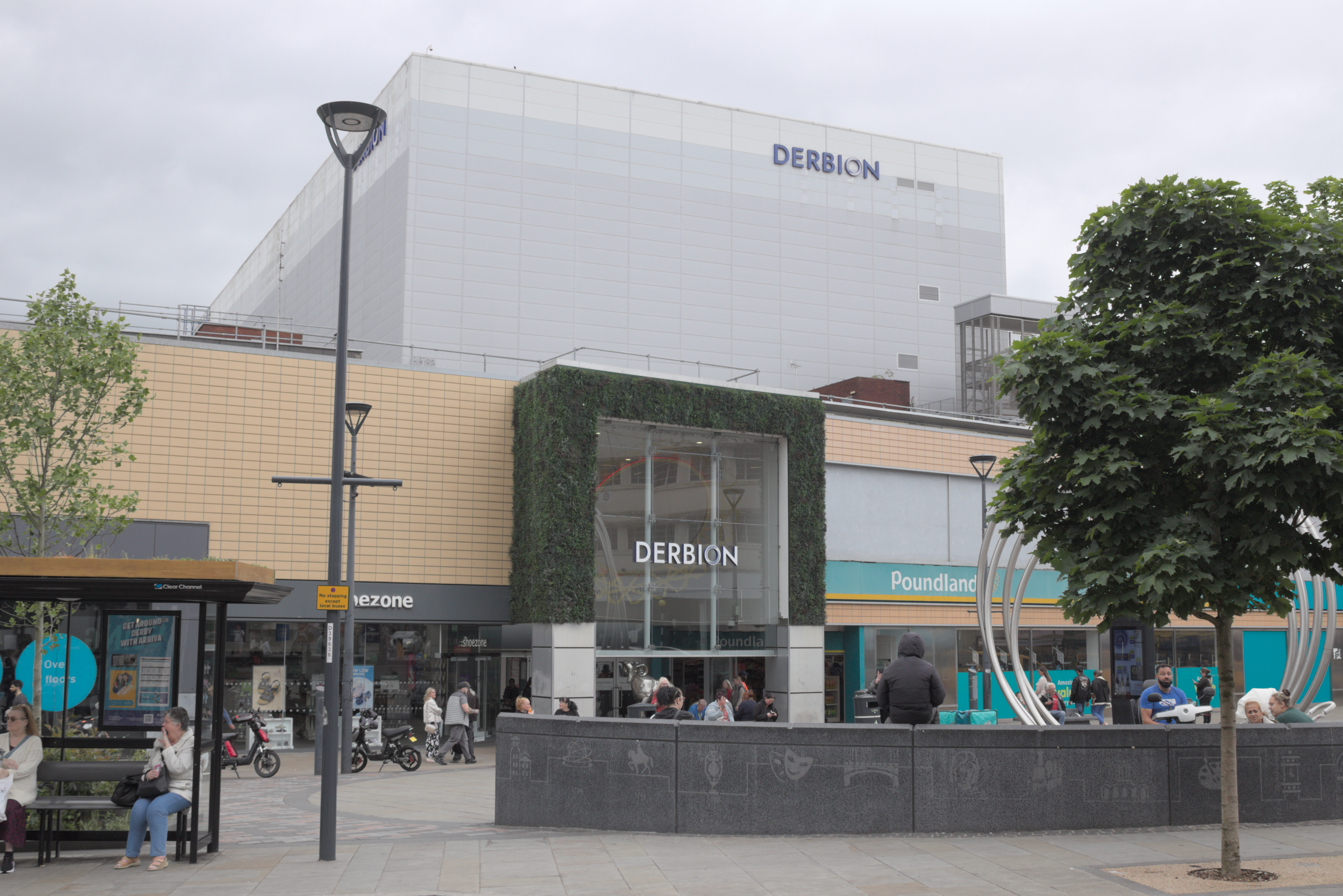
- Location: West Mall, Derby, England
- Coordinates: 52.919°N 1.473°W
- Opened: 1975; 51 years ago
- Manager: Savills
- Owner: Cale Street Investments
- Num. of stores: 199
- Num. of anchor tenants: 6
- Floor area: 106,130 m^{2} (1,142,400 sq ft)
- Floors: 3
- Parking: 3,647
- Website: www.derbion.com

Derbion (formerly Intu Derby, Westfield Derby and the Eagle Centre) is a large indoor shopping centre in Derby, England. It is the largest shopping centre in the East Midlands and the 15th largest in the United Kingdom.

== Overview ==
Derbion may contain up to 200 shops, a supermarket, a cinema and many eateries. Anchor tenants include Next, Marks & Spencer and Sainsbury's. There is also a cinema, named the Showcase Cinema de Lux, in the centre as well as a bowling arcade named Hollywood Bowl Group and a Paradise Island Adventure Golf venue. It has three car parks (Centre, Basement and Bradshaw Way) which are a few minutes walk away from both Derby's bus and railway stations. There was a previously a fourth car park, Riverside, but this closed in April 2023 and is planned to be demolished in the near future.

The former Eagle Market, once the UK's largest indoor market, adjoins the centre. The market, as well as Derby Theatre, were considered to be part of the centre until 2007, when the centre was known as The Eagle Centre. When the centre was expanded and renamed (see below), the market, owned by the Westfield Group and Hermès, but operated by Derby City Council, did not take on the Westfield name; it slightly changed its name from the Eagle Centre Market to simply the Eagle Market and introduced its own branding, separate from both the former Eagle Centre's and Westfield's), making itself distinct from the shopping centre for the first time. The Eagle Market closed on 29 July 2023 and is now currently being redeveloped.

A much smaller indoor shopping precinct, St Peter's Way, is also physically connected to Derbion. Customers can walk seamlessly between the two.

== History ==
The centre opened as The Eagle Centre on 20 November 1975, at a cost of £7 million. Several streets of pre-1950s terraced housing were demolished to make way for the new centre, including a street called Eagle Street, which gave the name of the new development.

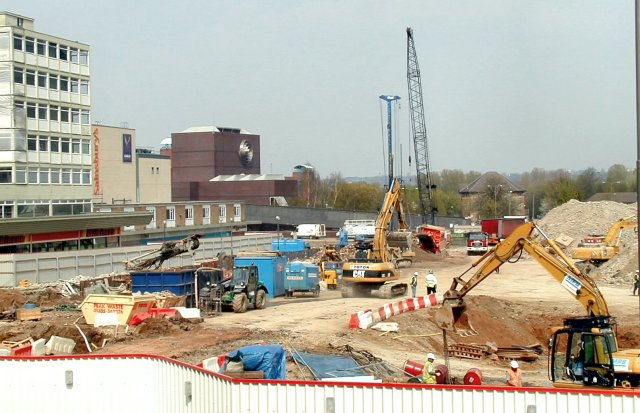
Construction work on the site in 2005

The centre's market was rebuilt in 1990, and the entire centre was refurbished in 1999. A £340m extension to the Eagle Centre was opened on 9 October 2007 by TV celebrity Tess Daly. The extension sits on the site of the former Castlefields Main Centre, a dilapidated outdoor shopping centre already owned by the Westfield Group. It doubled the size of the centre, from 51,559 m^{2} (554,980 sq ft) to 106,130 m^{2} (1,142,400 sq ft).

As well as adding many new retailers, the extension also houses an 800-seat foodcourt including a KFC outlet, a £30m twelve-screen Cinema de Lux and even more car parking facilities.

Many retailers, including Marks & Spencer and the now defunct Republic and Debenhams, closed their existing Derby stores to move to bigger stores in the extension. When the extension opened, the Eagle Centre was renamed Westfield Derby, in line with other Westfield shopping centres.

On 3 December 2010 a fire, which started in the car park, caused hundreds of shoppers to be evacuated from the building.

In March 2014, it was announced that Intu was to acquire Westfield Derby. On 1 May 2014, it was rebranded as Intu Derby.

In April 2019, Intu sold 50% of the centre to Cale Street Investments, an investment firm backed by the Kuwait Investment Office. On 9 September 2020, following Intu's administration, Cale Street purchased the remainder of Intu Derby. The centre was referred to as the Derby Centre while a new name was sought.

The chosen name of Derbion was decided on and released to public in late January 2021, taking effect on 1 March, with external signage being installed in September.

=== Naming timeline ===
Derbion has been given several different names throughout its history.

- 1975–2007: The Eagle Centre
- 2007–2014: Westfield Derby
- 2014–2020: intu Derby
- 2020–2021: Derby Centre
- 2021–present: Derbion

== See also ==
- List of shopping centres in the United Kingdom
