= Suri Krishnamma =

British film director and writer (born 1961)

- Born: 10 May 1961 (age 65); Shanklin, Isle of Wight
- Occupation: Film directory

Suri Krishnamma (born 10 May 1961) is a British film director and writer best known for feature films A Man of No Importance, New Year's Day and Dark Tourist and television dramas A Respectable Trade and The Cazalets. He has a number of festival awards, including 3 BAFTA nominations.

== Early life ==
Born in Shanklin, Isle of Wight, Suri Krishnamma is the son of an English mother and Indian father. His mother, a former head teacher at an Island comprehensive school, was a Labour Councillor and peace activist. Together with his father she helped with the organisation of the Isle of Wight Festivals of 1969 and 1970 with brothers Ronnie and Ray Foulk of Fiery Creations. During the 1969 festival, some of Bob Dylan's band (The Band) stayed in the Krishnamma family home.

== Career ==
Krishnamma studied Photography, Film and Television at Bournemouth and Poole College of Art and Design (now the Arts University Bournemouth), leaving with a BAFTA nomination for Mohammed's Daughter, then 3 years on the directing course at the National Film and Television School, collecting a second BAFTA nomination for Water's Edge. In 1989 he directed popular television drama series such as South of the Border (1989) and Spender (1991) before directing his first full-length film, O Mary This London, written by the Oscar nominated writer of My Left Foot, Shane Connaughton. His first global theatrical release was A Man of No Importance with Albert Finney and Brenda Fricker in 1994.

== Films ==
In 1999, New Year's Day won Best UK Feature Film at the Raindance Film Festival in London and the Grand Prix at Yubari. He directed Good Sharma starring Billy Connolly and Joan Allen, Locked In (2009) starring Ben Barnes, Bad Karma, Australia (2011) with Ray Liotta and Dark Tourist (2012) with Melanie Griffith which won Michael Cudlitz the Total Film Award for Best Actor at Frightfest, London (2013).

== Television ==
In British television and film drama Suri has worked alongside producers Simon Channing-Williams, Ruth Caleb, Jonathan Cavendish, Eric Fellner, Tony Garnett, Mark Redhead, Kieran Roberts, Mark Shivas, and Michael Wearing. Krishnamma has directed TV drama including Waking the Dead (2004), Sea of Souls (2005), Blue Murder (2006) and Cold Blood (2007). He was awarded a third BAFTA nomination for A Respectable Trade (1997). Based on Philippa Gregory's novel, this four-part drama set in 18th Century Bristol tells the story of an African slave and his relationship with the wife of a slave-trader and won Frances Tempest the BAFTA for best costume design. He followed this in 2001 with The Cazalets (produced by Verity Lambert and Joanna Lumley for Jane Tranter and Pippa Harris at the BBC) which gained BAFTA nominations for costume design and make-up design.

== Short films ==
Krishnamma's graduation film from Bournemouth, Mohammed's Daughter, earned him his first of three BAFTA nominations. He was awarded a second BAFTA nomination for 'Water's Edge' (NFTS), a Gold Mikeldi at the Bilbao International Festival of Documentary and Short Films, a Silver Hugo at the Chicago International Film Festival and screened at the Edinburgh International Film Festival where Krishnamma was runner up in the Young Filmmaker of the Year Award (1989).

Comrades and Friends (NFTS), co-directed with Nick Godwin, a documentary chronicling Tony Benn's campaign for the Labour Party (UK) leadership in 1988, won a certificate of merit at the Cork Film Festival in Ireland. Krishnamma travelled around the United States of America in 1989 following Jesse Jackson's putative campaign for the mayoralty of New York City. Between 2007 and 2010 he adapted and directed 3 Shakespeare tragedies, Hamlet, Macbeth and Othello, for the Actors Centre and Skillset.

== Personal life ==
Krishnamma is an honorary fellow of the Arts University Bournemouth and lectures in Film at Norwich University of the Arts. In 2013 he was appointed Jury President of the Munich International Festival of Film Schools (hosted by Filmfest München). He is a season ticket holder at West Ham United Football Club and lives in London with his wife and 3 children.

== Representation ==
Suri Krishnamma is represented in the UK by Phil Adie at Nick Turner Management.

== Filmography ==
- Dark Tourist (2012)
- Bad Karma (2011)
- Locked In (2010)
- Good Sharma (2009)
- New Year's Day (2000)
- A Man of No Importance (1994)
- O Mary This London (1993)

== Television ==
- Wuthering Heights (2003)
- The Chest (1996)
- The Place of the Dead (1995)
- The Turnaround (1994)
- The Cazalets (2001)
- A Respectable Trade (1997)
- Cold Blood (2007)
- Blue Murder (2006)
- The Sea of Souls (2005)
- Waking the Dead (2004)
- Dalziel and Pascoe (1998)
- Soldier Soldier (1992)
- Spender (1992)
- South of the Border (1989)

== Documentaries ==
- The Curry Connection (1990)
- Comrades and Friends (1989)
