= Roderick Ham =

British architect

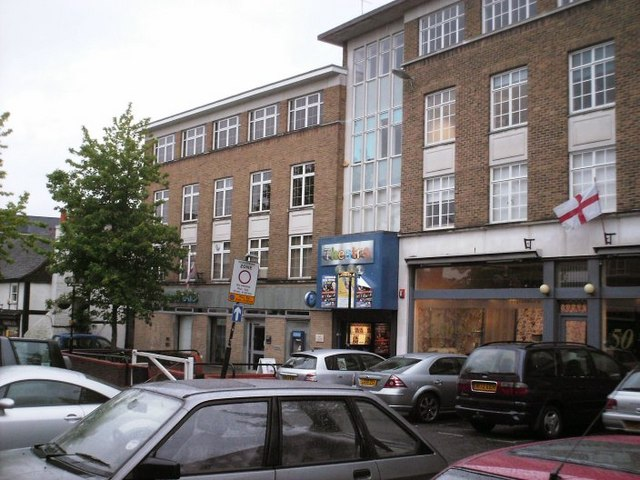
Thorndike Theatre, now known as the Leatherhead Theatre

Roderick Thomas Mathieson Ham (September 1925 – 19 January 2017) was a British architect, principally of theatres, who often worked with George Finch. He designed the New Wolsey Theatre in Ipswich, and the Thorndike Theatre in Leatherhead.

== Early life ==
Ham was born in Balham, South London. He was the son of Bob Ham, a salesman, and Rea (nee Mathieson-Macbeth).

In World War II, he served in the British Army, joining straight from school and rising to second lieutenant.

== Career ==
When he was demobbed in 1947, Ham joined the Architectural Association to start his studies as an architect, where he would return later in his career to teach.

In 1954 he set up his own practice, and due to his love of amateur dramatics, decided to concentrate on theatre design. His early work included alterations to the Festival theatre in Battersea Park and additions to the Royal Court. His first major project was designing, with George Finch, the Thorndike Theatre in Leatherhead within the shell of the disused 1930s Crescent Cinema, which opened in 1969. The building is now Grade II listed and won both a RIBA Award and a building for the disabled award in 1970.

Ham designed the Derby Playhouse with George Finch, which opened in 1975, and the New Wolsey Theatre in Ipswich, which was built from 1977 to 1979, followed by the Sackville theatre at Sevenoaks school in Kent, in 1981.

In 1961, Ham was one of the founding members of the Association of British Theatre Technicians and was elected a Fellow in 2012. With Peter Moro, he produced a series of information sheets on aspects of theatre design that were published by the Architects' Journal. Ham developed this work into his 1972 book Theatre Planning, and his 1987 publication Theatres: Planning Guidance for Design and Adaptation. He was elected Master of the Art Workers' Guild in 1989.

== Personal life ==
In 1955, he married Cara P. Aldridge. He died on 19 January 2017 at the age of 91.
