= John Godber =

Popular English playwright, born 1956

John Godber OBE
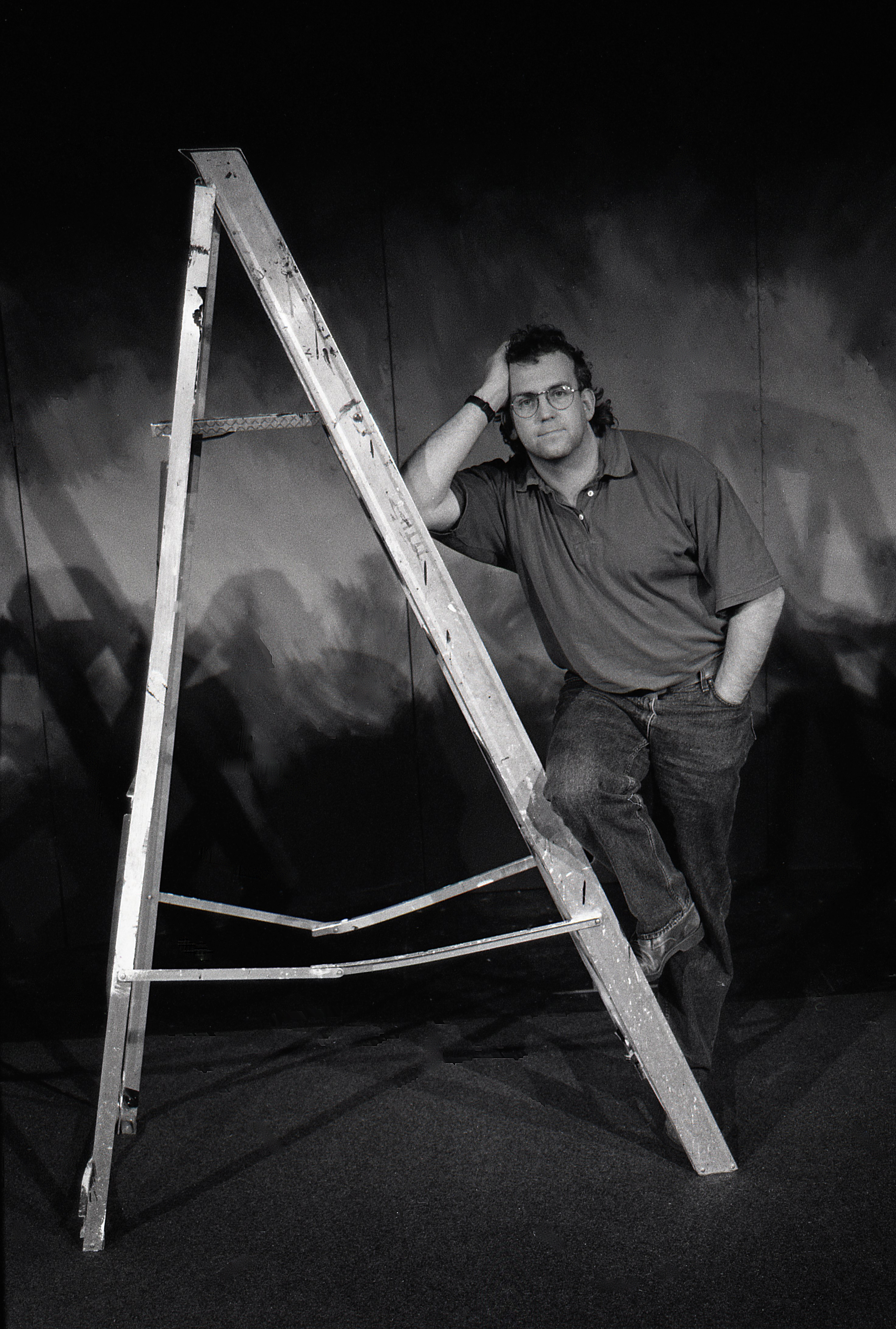
- Godber while director of Hull Truck Theatre, 1992
- Born: John Harry Godber; 18 May 1956 (age 70); Upton, West Riding of Yorkshire, England
- Occupations: Playwright, screenwriter, Creative Director of Theatre Royal Wakefield
- Spouse(s): Jane Thornton aka Jane Clifford, Jane Godber

John Harry Godber OBE (born 18 May 1956) is an English playwright, known mainly for observational comedies. The Plays and Players Yearbook of 1993 rated him the third most performed playwright in the UK after William Shakespeare and Alan Ayckbourn. He has been creative director of the Theatre Royal Wakefield since 2011.

== Early life and education ==
Godber was born in Upton, West Riding of Yorkshire. He trained as a teacher of drama at Bretton Hall College, which was affiliated to the University of Leeds, and became artistic director of Hull Truck Theatre Company in 1984.

== Career ==
Before venturing into plays, he was head of drama at Minsthorpe High School, now Minsthorpe Community College, where he had attended as a student, and then wrote for the TV series Brookside and Grange Hill. While he was at Minsthorpe he taught future actors Adrian Hood (Preston Front, Up 'n' Under film) and Chris Walker (Doctors, Coronation Street). A 1993 survey for Plays and Players magazine cited Godber as the third most performed playwright in the UK, after Shakespeare and Alan Ayckbourn. In 2005 he won two British Academy Children's Awards for Oddsquad, written and directed on location in Hull and screened by BBC children's television. His plays are performed across the world, Bouncers (1977) being the most popular.

In 2004 he became a visiting professor of Popular Theatre at Liverpool Hope University. He has also been professor of drama at Hull University. In 2011, Godber became creative director at Theatre Royal Wakefield and set up the John Godber Company as its resident company.

== Style ==
Godber's earlier style utilises an interest in German Expressionism, an economic and physical style inspired by this and the inspiration of Bretton Hall Head of School (Drama) John Hodgson. His later and more naturalistic style reflects his growth as a member of the middle classes and an Ayckbournesque world of drama. He says that the "new Godber" is perhaps a writer like Tim Firth.

== Personal life ==
Godber is married to the writer and actress Jane Thornton, also known as Jane Clifford and Jane Godber.

== Legacy ==
Godber is a Patron of the Second Chance Headway centre’s charity in Wakefield.

The theatre facility at New College, Pontefract, a college near his birthplace, is named the John Godber Theatre. It opened in 2012.

== Bibliography ==
- A Clockwork Orange (1976, adaptation)
- Bouncers (1977)
- Toys of Age (1979)
- Cramp (1982)
- The Chambers (1982)
- Cry Wolf (1981) first professional production
- Guyonal Priority Area (1982)
- Happy Jack (1982)
- September in the Rain (1983)
- Young Hearts Run Free (1983)
- Bouncers (for Yorkshire actors) (1983)
- Up 'n' Under (1984)
- A Christmas Carol (1984) adaptation
- Shakers (1985) co-written with Jane Thornton
- Up 'n' Under II (1985)
- Blood, Sweat and Tears (1986)
- Cramp – the Musical (1986)
- Putting On The Ritz (1986)
- Teechers (1987)
- Oliver Twist (1987) adaptation
- Salt of the Earth (1988)
- On the Piste (1990)
- Everyday Heroes (1990)
- Shakers Re-stirred (1991)
- Bouncers – 1990s Remix (1991)
- Happy Families (1991)
- April in Paris (1992)
- The Office Party (1992)
- Passion Killers (1994)
- Dracula (1995) adaptation
- Lucky Sods (1995)
- Shakers the Musical (1996)
- Gym and Tonic (1996)
- Weekend Breaks (1997)
- It Started with a Kiss (1997)
- Hooray for Hollywood (1998)
- The Weed (1998)
- Perfect Pitch (1998)
- Ella Chapman (1998)
- Thick as a Brick (1999)
- Big Trouble in the Little Bedroom (1999)
- Seasons in the Sun (2000)
- On a Night Like This (2000)
- Our House (2001)
- Departures (2001)
- Moby Dick (2002) adaptation
- Young Hearts (2002)
- Men of the World (2002)
- Reunion (2002)
- Going Dutch (2005)
- Unleashed (2006)
- The Crown Prince (2007)
- Next Best Thing (2007)
- Sold (2007)
- Our House (2008)
- Funny Turns (2009)
- Twenty Thousand Leagues Under the Seas (2010) adaptation
- The Debt Collectors (2011)
- The Sculptor's Surprise (2011) schools tour, co-written with Jane Thornton
- Lost and Found (2012) co-written with Jane Thornton
- Losing The Plot (2013)
- Muddy Cows (2013)
- A Kind of Loving (2013) adaptation
- Shafted (2015)
- Scary Bikers (2018)
- This is Not Right (2019)
- Sunny Side Up (2021)
- Living on Fresh Air (2023)
- Do I Love You (2023)
- The Highwayman (2024)
- Black Tie Ball (2025)

== Filmography ==
- Grange Hill (1978) TV series
- Toys of Age (1979) TV
- Brookside (1982) TV series
- The Rainbow Coloured Disco Dancer (1983) TV
- Crown Court (1983) TV
- The Ritz (1987) TV series
- My Kingdom for a Horse (1991) TV series
- Chalkface (1991) TV series
- Shakers (1993) TV
- Bloomin' Marvellous (1997) TV series
- Up 'n' Under (1998)
- Bouncers! (2000) TV
- Thunder Road (2001) TV
- Portas, Os (2005) TV
- Make that happy (1997) TV
