= List of words having different meanings in American and British English (A–L) =

This is the List of words having different meanings in British and American English: A–L. For the second portion of the list, see List of words having different meanings in American and British English: M–Z.

Asterisked (*) meanings, though found chiefly in the specified region, also have some currency in the other region; other definitions may be viewed by the other as Briticisms or Americanisms respectively. Additional usage notes are provided where useful.

== A ==
Word	British English meanings	Meanings common to British and American English	American English meanings
AA	The Automobile Association (US: AAA)	Alcoholics Anonymous	American Airlines
A&E	the accident and emergency (casualty) department of a hospital (US: emergency room, ER)		Arts & Entertainment (name of a television network)
accumulator	rechargeable battery (technical) a type of bet (US: parlay)	one that accumulates, as a type of computer processor register or a hydraulic accumulator	
ace	good, excellent (informal)	a one in a suit of playing cards someone who is very good at something (tennis) a winning serve in which the receiver does not touch the ball fighter pilot who has shot down at least 5 enemy aircraft an asexual person (slang)	(v.) to perform outstandingly *; esp., to achieve an A (on a school exam) (n.) the best starting pitcher in a rotation on a baseball team
advert	(n.) a contraction of advertisement (US: ad)	(v.) to turn the attention to or refer to something	
advocate (n.)	Scottish, also Isle of Man, Channel Islands or South African, lawyer who appears in higher courts (rest of UK: barrister)	someone who supports or speaks for a particular position generic term for a lawyer (v.) to recommend or support	
air marshal	a senior air force officer (equivalent to a USAF Lt. General)*	an undercover law enforcement officer on board a commercial aircraft, also known as a sky marshal	
à la mode		fashionable	with ice cream (ex. Apple pie à la mode)
allotment	a parcel of land in a community garden	the amount of something allocated to a particular person	
alternate		(adj.) done or occurring by turns; every second, every other ("on alternate weeks") (n.) one that alternates with another	(adj.) constituting an alternative, offering a choice (UK usu. & US also alternative) ("use alternate routes") "alternative", unconventional ("alternate lifestyles") (n.) an alternative *; a substitute
amber	orange-yellow traffic light (US: yellow light)	orange-yellow colour fossilised resin a material used in the construction of some tobacco pipes' stems (Amber) female given name (sealed in amber) state of being oblivious to changing circumstances	
anaesthetist (UK), anesthetist (US)	physician trained to induce anaesthesia (US: anesthesiologist)	someone who induces anesthesia.	a critical care experienced graduate level educated Registered Nurse who is nationally certified to induce anesthesia
anchor		a position in a tug of war team device for mooring ships by providing a firm fix to the seabed (anchorman/anchorwoman) the last member of a relay team to compete	a type of radio or TV presenter ("a news anchor"). See news presenter for a description of the different roles of a newscaster, an American news anchor, and a British newsreader. A dowel or fastener, usually made of plastic, that enables a weight-bearing screw to be attached to a wall (UK: wall plug); Rawlplug (trademark)
anorak	a parka (slang) a socially awkward person obsessively interested in something (syn. US: geek, nerd; dweeb; etc.)	hooded, rainproof outerwear that lacks a full-length zipper in the front (UK: cagoule)	
apartment	suite of rooms set aside for a particular person (rare), usu. rented housing unit in a larger building implying luxury (In other words, a narrower definition than the US.) (Overlapping with the rare usage in reference to stately homes or historic properties which have been converted into residential units.)		usu. rented housing unit in a larger building, regardless of luxury level (usu. flat in UK)– cf. s.v. condominium
appropriate (v.), appropriation (n.)	to take (money) to oneself, to filch or misappropriate	to take (money) (there is considerable overlap but difference of emphasis)	to dispense (money), to budget
Asian	originating from India, Pakistan, Bangladesh or Sri Lanka (South Asian)	originating from the continent of Asia	originating from East Asia or continental Southeast Asia
ass		donkey slow-witted or stupid person, often in combination (dumb-ass) unpleasant or unthinking person (less common colloquially) ("you ass")	(often vulgar) buttocks (UK: arse); also, by synecdoche, the person ("your ass is dead"); also (vulgar) anus (short for asshole) (vulgar) sex ("get some ass") (adv.) a postpositive intensive (i.e., to add emphasis to an adjective) ("He drove a big-ass truck") badass: someone of formidable strength or skill, e.g. "such a badass guitar player" kick-ass: to beat up or beat, e.g. "I am going to kick his ass" or, more positively, something that beat (did better than) everything else, e.g. "The opening band was kick-ass." (vulgar) someone acting inappropriately or offensively ("That guy was an ass!")
athletics	Sport comprising the events in track and field, cross country running, road running and racewalking		Athletic sports in general, (e.g. College athletics)
attorney		an agent or representative authorised to act on someone else's behalf ("attorney-in-fact", "power of attorney") (Attorney General) main legal advisor to the government	(or attorney-at-law) a lawyer (UK: barrister (England, Northern Ireland, Wales)/advocate (Scotland) or solicitor, depending on the actual profession) (District attorney, prosecuting attorney) local public official who represents the government in the prosecution of criminals (archaic in Br. Eng. for lawyer)
aubergine	the plant Solanum melongena, or its fruit (US: eggplant)	an aubergine-like colour (US also: eggplant)	

== B ==
Word	British English meanings	Meanings common to British and American English	American English meanings
backside (n.)		posterior, buttocks	(as two words, back side) rear of anything
banger (n.)	a sausage, as in "bangers and mash" an old motor car in a state of disrepair (US: beater or jalopy)	a type of firework	a particularly club-friendly beat or song a gang member (gang-banger) a party- usually a youth party
bang(s)		small explosions or reports; (v.) have sexual intercourse with (vulgar slang)	locks of hair on forehead (UK: fringe)
banker	a railway locomotive that temporarily assists the train hauled by another up a gradient (US: helper)	one who works in a bank	
base		foundation, starting point; many meanings in sciences, architecture, politics, military installation, etc.; see base	many figurative senses derived from baseball, e.g. off one's base (crazy), to get to first base (esp. in neg. constr., to get a first important result); more recently (slang), a metaphor for one of three different stages in making out (q.v.) – see baseball metaphors for sex; more s.v. home run
bash	Have a go – to try to achieve something, as in "have a bash at this crossword"	to strike physically to attack verbally a party or celebration "they're having a little bash this weekend" (orig. US, but now probably more common in UK than US)	
bath	(pl.) swimming pool (v.) to bathe, or give a bath to, example have a bath (US: take a bath meaning bathe)	(n.) plumbing fixture for bathing *(US: bathtub) (n.) the act of bathing	(n.) a bathroom (esp. a half bath which has a sink and toilet but no shower stall or bathtub, or a 3/4 bath which has a sink, toilet, and shower stall, but no bathtub)
bathroom	room containing a bath (US: bathtub) or shower, other washing facilities, and usu. (but not necessarily) a toilet		room, in a home or hotel room, containing a toilet, related washing facilities, and often, but not necessarily, a shower or bathtub (Hence "Going to the bathroom" is a euphemism for relieving oneself, regardless of place, such as "I went to the bathroom in my pants"*)
beaker	drinking vessel without a handle, or one (with or without handles) made of unbreakable plastic for the use of children (US: sippy cup)	flat-bottomed vessel, with a lip, used as a laboratory container.	
beater		person who flushes game from concealment so it can be shot at by 'the guns' something or someone that beats	used car or bicycle in very poor condition (UK: banger) (slang) wifebeater (q.v.) a sleeveless undershirt (from the stereotype that poor men who wear them beat their wives, perhaps from Jackie Gleason in "The Honeymooners" TV series (50s/60s US) or more likely from the costume of the character Stanley Kowalski in the play "A Streetcar Named Desire") (UK: vest)
beaver	beard; a bearded man (archaic slang)	aquatic rodent known for building dams woman's undepilated external genitalia (obscene slang)	vagina (slang)
bender	derogatory expression for a gay man, referring to the act of bending over to permit buggery.	an expression for a binge drinking spree.	
bespoke	(esp. of apparel) made to the customer's specification* (US: custom-made, tailor-made)	pret. of bespeak	
bill	The Bill=the police (slang, poss. from Old Bill)	invoice; request for payment (also US: check, tab) a proposed law before it is voted on by a legislature	a piece of paper money (UK: note/banknote)
billion	(now rare) a million million (10^{12}) (modern UK and US: trillion)	thousand million (10^{9}) (now standard in both UK and US) (traditional UK: milliard) (see also Long and short scales)	
bin	(v.) to throw away. (bread bin) container for storing bread (US: breadbox)	(1) a waste container (2) a usu. large receptacle or container for storage ("a grain bin"; "Scrooge McDuck's money bin")	
bird (np.)	one's girlfriend or any young female (slang; getting rarer and considered derogatory by some) prison sentence (slang)	a feathered animal of the class Aves an aircraft (aviation slang)	insulting hand gesture involving shaking one's fist towards someone with knuckles pointing towards the person being insulted and the middle finger extended (used chiefly in "flipping someone the bird") (slang)
biscuit (n.)	baked sweet or savoury cake-like item, usu. flat, which is hard when baked and softens over time (colloquially bikkies for sweet biscuits) (US: cookie (sweet biscuit), cracker savoury biscuit) (to take the biscuit) to be very surprising (US: take the cake)	a piece of wood used in joinery to join two larger pieces together	type of quick bread served with savory foods (UK: similar to a savoury scone)
blinder (n.)	excellent performance in a game or race (slang) "e.g. he played a blinder"		either of two flaps on a horse's bridle to keep it from seeing objects at its sides (UK: blinker, also used in US) (wear blinders) (colloq.) state of being oblivious, unresponsive to changing circumstances. Myopic, tunnel vision.
blinkers	leather flaps on a bridle used to restrict a horse's lateral vision*(US usu.: blinders)		turn signals, i.e. lights on a car that indicate the direction about to be taken *(UK: indicators)
block (n.)	a building (block of flats, office block)	a solid piece of something to obstruct (basketball) a blocked shot, or (plural) in the low post position near the basket, as in "on the blocks"	in a city, the portion of a street between adjacent intersections or an informal rough unit of distance derived from the length of the same. The usage to mean a single large building was common in the Western US until the early 20th century.
bloody	expletive attributive used to express anger ("bloody car") or shock ("bloody hell"), or for emphasis ("not bloody likely") (slang, today only mildly vulgar) *(similar US: damn ("damn car"))	having, covered with or accompanied by blood	considered a euphemism for more emphatic swear words
blow off	to break wind	to perform oral sex upon	to fail to turn up to meet somebody, to disavow or fail to meet an obligation (UK: blow out) ("I'm just too busy, I'll have to blow you off for this evening.")
bog (n.)	toilet (slightly vulgar slang) (bog off) go away (slightly vulgar slang, often jocular)	wetland that accumulates appreciable peat deposits	A plot of artificially floodable farmland used to grow cranberries (a cranberry bog)
bogey	dried nasal mucus usu. after extraction from the nose (US: booger) (informal)	the score of one over par in golf	an unidentified aircraft, often assumed to be that of an enemy alternate spelling of "Bogie" (nickname of Humphrey Bogart)
boiler (n.)	1. an old fowl best cooked by boiling; 2. (derogatory) an ugly woman (usually in the phrase "old boiler")	1. device (usu. oil or gas-fired) for heating water for central heating or hot water *, "central heating boiler" (US furnace); 2. vessel in which steam is generated	A car (1930s slang)
bomb	a striking success; used in the phrases "go (like) a bomb" and "go down a bomb"; Go like a bomb also means, when used of a vehicle, to go very fast	an explosive weapon	(v.) to be a failure ("the show bombed"); also as n. (n., used with the) something outstanding ("that show was the bomb"); sometimes spelled da bomb
bombardier	corporal in the Royal Artillery – see Bombardier (rank)		crew member of a bomber responsible for assisting the navigator in guiding the plane to a bombing target and releasing the aircraft's bomb load – see Bombardier (air force) (UK: bomb aimer)
bonk	act of sexual intercourse, or to have sexual intercourse (slightly vulgar slang) (US: boink)	blow to the head (n. and v.) to suffer glycogen depletion in an endurance sporting event; see hitting the wall	
bonnet	hinged cover over the engine in a car (US: hood)	hat tied under chin worn by a baby or (archaically) a woman	
boob (n.)	a mistake (slang); (v.) to make a mistake (US: blooper)	woman's breast (slightly vulgar slang)	stupid person
boob tube	woman's shoulderless, strapless top (US: tube top)		(the boob tube) television (slang)
boost		to (figuratively) lift up; to improve, increase, revitalize.	to (literally) lift up, especially a person: booster cushion*, a cushion used to increase the height of a seat (esp. in a car) to steal, especially from a retail establishment (i.e., shoplift)
boot	storage compartment of a car (US: trunk)	footwear covering lower leg to kick something hard to start up a computer	(Denver boot, car boot) device used to render cars immobile (UK: wheel clamp) to expel (UK: give someone the boot *)("I have been given the Order of the Boot", Winston Churchill) to vomit (slang) to shoot up (with intravenous drugs) (ex: to boot cocaine or heroin; slang)
booty		treasure or the proceeds of looting	(African American Vernacular English, but widely appropriated elsewhere), esp. female buttocks as in "Shake that booty" (booty call) invitation to a sexual encounter (slang)
boss		the person you report to at work	cool, totally awesome (slang) e.g. "That is a boss Zefron poster"
bottle	courage ("he's got some bottle") (slang) (US: moxie) to fail to do something through fear ("he's bottled out", "he bottled it") (slang) to attack somebody with a broken bottle (slang)	container for liquids (the bottle) alcohol, heavy drinking (synecdochical slang)	
box	a gift in a box, hence Boxing Day genital protector used in cricket (US similar: protective cup) (the box) television set (slang) (US: idiot box, boob tube) a box stall in a barn any of various box-like structures, such as: signal box (US: switch/signal/interlocking tower) telephone box (US & UK also: telephone booth), more at call box witness box (US: witness stand) either one of the two marked areas adjacent to the goalmouth on an association football pitch (see here) see also box junction	(n.) rigid container (v.) to attack using one's fists (n.) general-purpose computer (e. g. "this box needs its hard disk re-formatted")	any of various areas on a baseball diamond (as for the batter, or the pitcher, the catcher, etc.) female genitalia (obscene slang) * (box canyon) a canyon with vertical walls (boxcar) a type of enclosed railroad freight car (UK: goods van) a three-ball "frame" for one player in candlepin bowling (New England) the genital area (ex: kicked in the box; vulgar slang)
brace bracers braces	over-the-shoulder straps to support trousers *(US usu. suspenders, q.v.)	support that steadies or strengthens something else devices for straightening teeth a pair or couple of something, typically game birds or animals	leg supports (UK: callipers) tertiary enclosing punctuation: { } (UK: curly brackets)
brackets	enclosing punctuation: ( ) (US & UK also: parentheses); more at braces	supports for shelves, etc. attached to a wall enclosing punctuation: square brackets [] (US: brackets/crochets), curly brackets {} (US: braces)	secondary enclosing punctuation: [] (UK: square brackets)
brew (n.)		tea	beer coffee
brilliant	excellent, of the highest quality (rarely sarcastic)	very bright (of a light or a brain) very intelligent	
bud		undeveloped shoot which normally occurs in the axil of a leaf or at the tip of a plant stem	marijuana (slang) hand-rolled marijuana cigarette (slang), compare joint shortening of 'buddy', used to address strangers assuming a non-existent familiarity (UK: similar: mate)
buffet	railway carriage containing a refreshment counter selling snacks and drinks, esp. on a train on which a full restaurant car (US: dining car) service is not provided	refreshment counter or bar; a meal set out on a table, etc. for diners to serve themselves	a type of sideboard
bug		insect of the order Hemiptera pathogen, bacteria, germ covert listening device (orig. US) defect in software (orig. in a machine) (orig. US) an enthusiast of something (orig. US) (v.) to apply a covert listening device (orig. US) (v.) to annoy (colloquial)	any of various insects *(nontechnical usage) an important person ("a big bug"); also, someone crazy (as in "firebug", a pyromaniac)* to go away, depart, also from a responsibility (used with out) (bug off) to go away (often as a command) (from UK bugger, q.v.); Volkswagen Beetle
bugger	(buggered) 1. broken, not working (typically of mechanical devices, e.g. "the engine's buggered") (slang); 2. syn. for bothered (e.g. "I didn't do it. I couldn't be buggered.") (slang) (bugger up) to make a mess of something (slang) (bugger off) (imperative) go away, leave me alone (slang)	(usually vulgar) to engage in, or someone who engages in, anal sex a form of address for either a person or item, either jocular ("he's a generous bugger", "I finally found the little bugger!") or less so ("he's a mean bugger") (slang)	term of endearment, often used for children (slang) a bug (insect)
buggy	2-wheeled horse-drawn lightweight carriage baby transport vehicle also called (UK) pushchair (US: stroller) any of various light cart or cars ("a golf buggy")	(slang) an automobile (orig. US) see baby transport for details see also dune buggy	4-wheeled horse-drawn lightweight carriage baby transport vehicle also called (US) baby carriage (UK: pram) regional (esp. South) for shopping cart (UK: trolley) (marsh/swamp buggy) a type of motor vehicle for marshland (slang) caboose horse and buggy: a horse harnessed to a wheeled-vehicle
bum	to engage in anal sex (vulgar slang)	to cadge ("can I bum a cigarette off you?") (slang) buttocks (colloquial) (US: butt)	hobo, homeless person poor quality (slang) to sadden (often used with "out") injured or lame ("a bum knee")
bumps	a type of rowing race a method of marking someone's birthday (see Birthday customs and celebrations)	a set of small protuberances	
bunk	to be absent without authorization: bunk off, to play truant from school (US: play hooky) do a bunk, to abscond (US: go on the lam)	type of bed, where two small beds are stacked on top of each other (UK bunk (up) with implies sharing a bed, rather than merely a room) nonsense as in "History is bunk" (from bunkum)	group of plain beds used as no-frills lodging (UK: dormitory, q.v.); also used as a verb ("I bunked with them in their room"; "The cabin could bunk about 18")
bureau	a type of writing table	a public office or government agency	a type of chest of drawers
burn (n.)	(Scotland and Northern England) narrow river, stream – more s.v. creek	wound caused by heat, or chemical agents, etc.	(n.) clearing (as in a forest) made by burning vegetation
bus (v.)		to travel by bus	to clear (as tables) in a restaurant; to work as a busboy
butcher	(have a butcher's) to have a look (rhyming slang: butcher's hook=look)	to kill and cut up an animal for meat to kill messily, or someone who does so one who cuts and sells meat	to make a big mess of things; botch ("butcher it up"; "I butchered the spelling")
butchery (n.)	slaughterhouse, abattoir	a cruel massacre a butcher's trade	a botch
butt (n.)		(n.) the (larger) end of anything, a stub; also, a cigarette a sudden blow given by the head of an animal a large wooden cask a person mocked by a joke (v.) to strike bluntly (as with the head) (butt in) to interfere when uncalled for (orig. US)	(colloquial) buttocks (UK usu. bum); hence butthead * (n.) (butt-in) one who butts in (v.) to cut off the end (of a log) (butt out) to stop interfering
buzzard	a bird of prey of the genus Buteo		vulture (slang)

== C ==
Word	British English meanings	Meanings common to British and American English	American English meanings
calipers (n.)	(n.) A metal support for a person's leg and/or ankle. (US: ankle braces, leg braces)	(n.) An instrument for measuring external or internal dimensions, having two hinged legs resembling a pair of compasses and in-turned or out-turned points.	
callbox (n.)	telephone booth (UK also telephone box)		roadside emergency telephone
call for (v.)		to require or advocate	to predict or anticipate ("The forecast calls for rain")
campsite (n.)	area or park for people to camp in (US: campground)		spot for a particular person or group to camp, often within a campground (UK: pitch)
can		(n.) small metal container (v.) to place in such a container (modal v.) to be able to	(v.) to fire someone from a job (UK: sack) (n.) toilet (slang), jail (n.) buttocks
canteen (n.)	food service location usually at a work place or institution (US: cafeteria)	a box with compartments for storing eating utensils, silverware etc. a military mess kit water bottle, typically used for military or camping purposes.	
candy (n.)	(candy floss) heated sugar spun into thin threads and collected into a mass, usually on a stick; something pleasing but having little worth (US: cotton candy for both senses)	(v.) to sugarcoat, or boil with sugar (as fruit) to sweeten edible, sweet-tasting confection containing sugar, or sometimes artificial sweeteners, and often flavored with fruit, chocolate, nuts or artificial flavours; a piece of candy (UK: sweets, confectionery)	(eye candy) (derog.) someone who is physically attractive (See also arm candy.)
canfield (n.)	a patience (solitaire) card game (US: Klondike)		a patience (solitaire) card game (UK: Demon)
car (n.)	railway vehicle, only in combination (e.g. "restaurant car", except London Underground "carriage") (archaic) street tramway vehicle	motorcar (n.) (UK, q.v.)/automobile	nonpowered unit in a railroad or railway train ("railroad car"; "a passenger/freight/parlor/dining/baggage etc. car") (see s.v. motor car, trolley; UK: cf. s.v. carriage, coach, wagon) elevator (q.v.) cage
caravan	towed recreational vehicle containing accommodation (US: travel trailer) to take such a vehicle on holiday	overland trading convoy	a type of minivan sold in the United States (see Dodge Caravan)
caretaker (n.)	one who takes care of a building, e.g. a school (US: janitor; cf. s.v. custodian) one put in charge of a farm after eviction of tenant	one who takes care of someone or something stopgap government or provisional government	one who takes care of real estate in exchange for rent-free living accommodations *
carnival	(n.) a street festival typically involving music, dancing and processions	(adj.) suggesting a festive atmosphere	(n.) a travelling circus or fair (UK: funfair) comprising amusement rides
carousel (n.)		a moving luggage/baggage display unit, most often at airports	a rotating fairground ride (UK: merry-go-round, roundabout)
carriage (n.)	railway coach (q.v.) designed for the conveyance of passengers the conveying of goods or the price paid for it ("carriage-paid"); "handling"	4-wheeled horse-drawn private passenger vehicle	(baby carriage) baby transport vehicle featuring the infant lying down facing the pusher (UK: perambulator, pram) – more s.v. buggy a shopping cart (primarily in North Atlantic states)
carry on, carryon	(informal) have a love affair	(colloquial) carrying-on, unruly behaviour (v.) continue (Keep Calm and Carry On)	luggage that can be carried aboard an aircraft, bus, or train (UK: hand luggage or baggage)
cart		usu. 2-wheeled one-horse vehicle (as that used in farming)	a lightweight wheeled vehicle, as for shopping, serving, carrying baggage, etc. (UK: trolley) cartridge (primarily related to video games)
casket (n.)	a small box, as for jewels, particularly an antique		The type of coffin with upholstery and a half-open lid, any coffin
casualty (person)	often, someone who has been wounded; hence casualty department (US: emergency room)	generally, someone who has been injured or killed	often, someone who has been killed; see also casualty insurance
catapult	small Y-shaped handheld projectile weapon often used by children (US: slingshot)	a type of medieval siege engine an aircraft catapult	(v.) rise quickly
chaps [?]	men or boys (but increasingly used for people of either sex; in the singular it still almost exclusively refers to a male, "Guys" has become a more popular phrase in the UK) (US & UK: guys) one's friends ("the chaps") (US & UK: the guys) cheeks – as in Bath Chaps – stewed pigs' cheeks, a delicacy		leather leggings originally worn by cowboys and designed to protect the legs against thorns (sometimes pronounced shaps), short for "chaparajos", or the similar items worn by motorcyclists as a form of leg protection
check		examine for a particular purpose a pattern of coloured squares a warning given in chess	leave items in the care of someone else (e.g. at a cloakroom; hence checkroom) (also check mark) mark used to denote 'correct' or indicate one's choice (UK: tick, q.v.) request for payment, especially at a restaurant; bill written order for a bank to pay money (UK: cheque)
checker		one who checks (e.g. an inspector)	a store or shop cashier (almost always a grocery store) (checkers) a popular board game (UK: draughts) to mark with alternating colored squares (UK: chequer)
cheers (interjection)	said to express gratitude, or on parting (slang). Also cheerio.	used as a toast or valediction	
chemist	pharmacist, pharmacy (US similar: druggist, drugstore)	student or researcher of chemistry	
chew	a chewy sweet (US: taffy)	to break down food with the teeth, masticate (chew on something, chew something over) (colloquial) to consider or discuss	referring to or using chewing tobacco
chip in	to express one's opinion (as in a conversation); to "chime in"	to contribute (as money) (orig. US)	
chips (food)	Long cuts of deep fried potato, usu. thick cut resembling American steak fries	French fries, in (orig. UK) phrase fish and chips	thin slices of fried potato*(UK: crisps)
chippie, chippy	carpenter (slang); fish-and-chip shop (slang) (Ire: chipper)	(adj.; chippy only) aggressively belligerent, especially in sport	loose woman (dated slang); the N. American bird Chipping sparrow
chum		friend (sometimes sarcastic)	(n.) waste products from fish processing (heads, tails, blood etc.) often used for shark fishing (v.) to spread fish entrails etc. in the hope of luring sharks. "We chummed the water all morning, but never spotted any dorsal fins." Has some cross-over usage metaphorically in non-fishing situations.
cider	an alcoholic drink derived from apples (US: hard cider)		unfiltered, unpasteurized, unfermented apple juice
Cinderella	a team which underachieves, or is overshadowed by successful neighbouring rivals*	fairy tale character	a lowly sports team or individual which enjoys an unexpectedly good run in a tournament
city	a large town, in particular a town created a city by charter and/or containing a cathedral. (Some cathedral cities, such as St Asaph, St David's and Wells, are mere villages.) "The City": the City of London, London's financial centre, hence financial markets and investment banking more generally (cf. US Wall Street)	A human settlement with a large population	a usually large or important municipality governed under a charter granted by the state (however some smaller towns in the US are cities); an element of a standard mailing address (UK "postal town")
clerk		administrative worker	(or salesclerk) store or shop worker (UK: shop assistant) hotel employee at the reservation desk (US & UK: receptionist)
closet	any small room (esp. Northern England, Scotland, & Ireland); hence water closet, a room containing a flush toilet, later the toilet itself	a private chamber for retirement in secret; (come out of the closet) to reveal what was secret (especially in relation to homosexuality) (closet queen) (colloq., disparaging) someone who keeps their homosexuality secret	a cabinet or wardrobe, as for utensils or apparel; in the latter case oftenest built-in; hence e.g. walk-in closet, linen closet, and skeleton in the closet *(UK also: in the cupboard) *
coach	bus with a higher standard of comfort, usually chartered or used for longer journeys* tutor, usu. private, who prepares pupils for examinations* railway carriage*	enclosed horse-drawn passenger carriage sports trainer	extracurricular sports teacher at a school (UK: PE teacher) lowest class on a passenger aircraft (UK: economy)
cob	(mainly Northern & Central Eng.) a type of bread roll ("Chip cob", "ham cob", "pack of six cobs please") (pl.) large globules of sweat ("I'm sweating cobs")	The portion of a corn plant around which the kernels grow. a building material a type of horse a male swan	
cock	(n.) form of address to a man to gain attention or greet e.g. "Wotcha cock!" a popular personage e.g. Cock o' the North (v.) (cock up) * to make a mess of things; cock-up (n.) is the act or the resulting state of affairs (n.) a male bird; esp., an adult male chicken (US oftenest rooster) (n.) nonsense	(n.) penis (vulgar slang) (v.) to set the hammer or firing pin of a loaded firearm ready for firing; likewise, to "cock the shutter" of an old, spring-activated camera (n.) A type of tap, faucet, or valve (e.g., a stopcock).	
collect	To win a bet (from the idea of picking up the winnings)	(v.) to gather together, to pick up; (orig. US) to pick up a person or thing (n.) short prayer read during the first part of a church service as practised by certain parts of the Christian faith; mainly Anglican and Roman Catholic.	(adj., adv.) charged to the receiver ("to call collect", to reverse the charges) ("a collect call") [from collect on delivery]
college	part of the name of some state secondary schools (US approx.: high school) and many independent schools (US approx.: prep school)	constituent part of some larger universities, especially ancient universities educational institution between school and university (e.g. sixth form college (UK), technical college, college of further education (UK), community college (US)) vocational training institution (technical college in the US) professional association which usu. grants some form of professional qualifications, mostly in the medical field (e.g. Royal College of Surgeons, American College of Surgeons)	an independent institution of higher education (as a small university or a division of a university) granting bachelor's degrees generic term for higher education, but only at the undergraduate level. Notwithstanding, postgraduate degree programs may be offered by university subunits that happen to be denominated as "colleges".
comforter	a baby's dummy (old-fashioned; US: pacifier)	one who comforts	quilted bedspread (UK: duvet)
commissioner	professional head of the Metropolitan Police Service and City of London Police (US: chief of police)		A civilian public official in charge of a municipal governmental department, and particularly of a police department member of any commission
commode		small cabinet portable toilet for use in a room without plumbing	normal toilet, in a bathroom (q.v.)
compensation		the act of compensating damages awarded for a legal wrong (workers' compensation) payment to injured workers	remuneration received by employees (unemployment compensation) compensation paid to an unemployed person (as a laid-off worker), arising from government resources
concession	reduction in price (discount) for a certain category of person	the action of conceding in politics, the action of a candidate yielding to another an area within one country that is administered by another	a lease or grant of premises or land for a particular use, or the so contracted-out service, as in concession stand, i.e. a counter, stand or area at public entertainment venues where snacks or drinks are sold, often at inflated prices a concession stand
condominium		a political territory (state or border area) in or over which two sovereign powers formally agree to share equally dominium (in the sense of sovereignty) and exercise their rights jointly	(also condo) a type of joint ownership of real property (as an apartment building) in which portions of the property are commonly owned and other portions are individually owned; an apartment in a condominium
constable	technically, a police officer of any rank, but usu. understood to mean a police officer of the lowest rank (one who holds no other more specific rank) (US: officer or patrolman)		peace officer in a township without an organised police department official who serves summonses (UK: bailiff or sheriff's officer)
construction		the act or process of building or constructing; a structure; the construction industry from construe: the assigning of meaning to ambiguous terms	road construction and maintenance work; roadwork ("a construction area/zone") (UK: roadworks)
cooker	an appliance for cooking food (US: cookstove, stove, range) a cooking apple, a large sour apple used in cooking	a pot or utensil for cooking in ("pressure cooker", "rice cooker", "slow cooker")	a person who cooks (UK: cook)
cookie	a bun (Scotland) a biscuit of a particular variety, usually containing chocolate chips (often referred to as a "chocolate chip cookie")	a small packet of information stored on users' computers by websites	a small, flat baked cake *(UK usu. biscuit, q.v.) fellow, guy *("a tough cookie"); also, an attractive girl * (that's the way the cookie crumbles) that's how things go (to toss one's cookies) to vomit (cookie-cutter) trite, banal a cook or Culinary Specialist (Army and Navy slang)
cop	to take ("cop a look at this", "cop one of these") (slang) to be blamed for, be caught ("he'll cop it!") (slang)	police officer (short for "copper") (slang) (cop a feel) to grope (slang)	(cop a plea) (law, orig. slang) to plead guilty to a lesser offence to not be tried for a graver charge; compare plea bargain (cop a squat) to take a seat (slang)
copper	low value coin, brown or 'copper' coloured (currently 1p and 2p coins) large copper vessel used for heating water and washing clothes (archaic)	the metallic element copper police officer (slang, orig. UK)	
coriander	the leaves of the coriander plant, used as a herb (US: cilantro or Chinese parsley)	the plant Coriandrum sativum dried seeds of this plant	
corn	wheat in England, oats in Scotland and Ireland any of various cereal plants or grains (US usu.: grain), also in combination (e.g. cornfield, a field of any cereal) (see also US)	in both dialects, the principal crop cultivated in a particular region Indian corn, in corn on the cob, corn flakes, popcorn horny swelling on the foot	Zea mays; originally known as Indian corn (q.v.; UK usu.: maize or sweetcorn); hence cornfield, cornstarch (UK: corn flour), cornbread, cornball, cornblade, etc. something corny *, hence cornball
cot	infant bed; hence cot death (US: crib)	camp bed	
cotton wool	soft cotton wadding, used for cleaning wounds or make-up (US: Absorbent cotton, cotton ball)		raw cotton
coulee		a (solidified) stream of lava	(chiefly Western, orig. Canadian) a deep steep-sided ravine formed by erosion, or a small valley or stream
course	the entire degree programme a student takes at university		an individual subject a student takes at university
court shoe	a women's dress shoe with a heel (US: pump, q.v.)		a type of athletic shoe used for sports played on an indoor court, such as volleyball or squash (UK similar: plimsoll or regionally pump)
cowboy	an unscrupulous or unqualified tradesman	a legendary archetype found in Wild West genre works (derog.) one who is reckless, uncontrollable.	a cowhand working with livestock (UK: drover)
cracker	small parcel that makes an explosive report when pulled from both ends, traditionally pulled at Christmas attractive woman (slang) anything good ("the new product is a cracker") (slang)	thin, hard, unsweetened biscuit (formerly chiefly US, now common everywhere) a person who commits illegal acts by exploiting security flaws in a computer system	an unsophisticated, typically rural white person (also white cracker; derogatory slang, southeastern US)
crèche	day care, day nursery		nativity scene, manger scene, crib (q.v.) *
creek	tidal channel through a coastal marsh (orig. sense)		any inland stream of water smaller than a river (other terms: UK: rill, gill; N. Eng. & Scot.: burn; Eng. & New Eng.: brook; Midland US: run)
crew		body of people manning a vehicle of any kind gang of manual workers (e.g. road crew) group of friends or colleagues ("I saw him and his crew at the bar")	rowing as a sport
crib (n.)	nativity scene, crèche (q.v.) *	a manger or rack, or stall for cattle a plagiarism, as of a student ("crib sheet") cribbage	small enclosed bedstead for a child; hence crib death (UK: cot) (informal) one's house or apartment a bin for storing maize a structure of logs to be anchored with stones; used for docks, dams, etc. (orig. Canada) a small raft of timber
crisp	fried potato slices with salt, sometimes with flavour (US: potato chips)	brittle, crunchy, dry, firm	
crowbar	long, straight, heavy, steel bar for digging or leverage (US digging bar)	steel bar with one curved end, for prying things apart Crowbar (circuit), a form of electronic protection	
crumpet	an attractive female (slang)	A savoury waffle-like cake made from flour or potato and yeast	
cubicle	A compartment in a bathroom with low walls that contains a toilet. (US: stall)	A compartment in a larger area separated from similar adjoining compartments by low walls, such as in an office area.	
cuffs		The ends of a garment's sleeves, furthest from the wearer short for handcuffs	An arrangement at the bottom of trouser-legs, in which the material is folded back upon itself to form a trough externally around the bottom of the leg. (UK: turn-ups)
cunt	offensive (or sometimes indulgent) term often applied to men	vagina (usu. obscene)	offensive, obscene term usu. applied to women
cupboard	a place to store things (US: closet)	a cabinet or small recess with a door and typically shelves, used for storage	
custodian	an association football goalkeeper	a keeper or guardian of a person or thing	one who cleans and maintains a building; a building superintendent, a janitor

== D ==
Word	British English meanings	Meanings common to British and American English	American English meanings
daddy longlegs, daddy-long-legs	crane fly	daddy long-legs spider	Opiliones
dead	(of a cup, glass, bottle or cigarette) empty, finished with very, extremely ("dead good", "dead heavy", "dead rich")	deceased completely, perfectly ("dead straight", "dead on", "dead right") extremely quiet (e.g. business or nightlife) (dismissive usage) boring	
dead beat, deadbeat	exhausted (slang) (US: dead tired)		an idler; someone who does not pay their debts, often in construction ("deadbeat dad") (slang)
DC	Detective Constable, a police officer who works in or with a branch of CID.	direct current (see also other expansions)	District of Columbia
deck		(n.) the floor or level of a ship or other types of vehicles the roadway of a bridge a recording device (v.) to decorate for a festivity ("deck the halls with boughs of holly", "decked out with flags") to hit a person hard enough such that they fall to the floor (orig. US) a pack of cards	a wooden, raised platform adjoining a house, usu. enclosed by a railing a packet of narcotics (slang) (v.) to pile up (logs) on a deck of logs or a skidway (on deck) in baseball, the hitter due up next ("Albert is on deck, so they must be careful to not walk this batter."). A general usage connotes availability, e.g. "Who's on deck?" (Who is available to do this?). Occasionally used to indicate who is next in line.
deductible		(adj.) able to be deducted or allowable as a deduction, particularly of tax	(n.) an insurance excess
Dennis the Menace	a character and comic strip developed by Ian Chisholm and Davey Law, debuted in March 1951 (US: Dennis)		a character and comic strip developed by Hank Ketcham, debuted in March 1951
depot	a location (large building or piece of land) where buses, trams or trains are stored when not in use and maintained (pronounced /ˈdɛpoʊ/)	a storehouse or depository; a location for the storage of military or naval supplies (pronounced /ˈdɛpoʊ/ in BrE, /ˈdiːpoʊ/ in AmE); A slow-release drug injection (usu. psychiatric) (pronounced /ˈdɛpoʊ/ in both dialects)	a railroad station or bus terminal or station; also, an air terminal (pronounced /ˈdiːpoʊ/)
derby	rivalry between two sports teams of close proximity or that frequently meet, especially in football	a type of horse race; by extension, any organised race	a bowler hat
DI	Detective inspector (police)		Drill instructor (military)
diary	personal calendar *(US: appointment book, appointment calendar, datebook)	personal journal	
digital radio		any radio that receives a digital signal	a radio with a digital display
dim (trans. v.), dimmer (switch)		to reduce the intensity of a domestic, industrial or other light; hence dimmer (switch)	to lower a vehicle headlight's beam, typically when approaching vehicles travelling in the opposite direction at night (UK: dip); hence dimmer switch (UK: dip switch)
diner		one who dines	railroad dining car (UK: restaurant car) a type of restaurant, traditionally but not necessarily often resembling a dining car
dinky	small and cute		disappointingly small and worthless
dip (trans. v.), dip switch	to lower a vehicle headlight's beam, typically when approaching vehicles travelling in the opposite direction at night (US: dim); hence dip switch (distinguished from DIP switch) (US: dimmer switch) (n.) a pickpocket (slang)	to lower into a liquid; esp., a sheep or dog in chemical solution; to lower and then raise	to use smokeless tobacco
dirt		substance(s) rendering something unclean incriminating evidence ("we've got the dirt on him now")	earth, soil * Used in special senses in American English, in combinations such as dirt farmer, dirt floor, dirt roof, dirt road
diversion	circuitous route to avoid roadworks (US: detour)	deviation; recreation; tactic used to draw attention away from the action	
dock	water between or next to a pier or wharf (US: berth, also used in UK, or slip) section of a courtroom where the accused sits during a trial *	(v.) to reduce an employee's wages, usu. as discipline	constructed place to moor a boat or engage in water sports (largely interchangeable with pier or wharf, although often with a modifier, such as "ferry dock", "swimming dock", etc.)
docker	dockworker, stevedore *(US: longshoreman)	one who docks (as tails of animals)	
dogging	various kinds of public sexual activity	pursuing diligently or persistently, as a dog would	insulting in a persistent fashion, often referring to the dozens
dollar	5 shilling coin or equivalent amount (obsolete; used in slang until the early 1970s, especially in "half-dollar"=half-crown, but some re-stamped Spanish dollar coins were used in the UK in the late 18th/early 19th century)	major unit of currency of the US	
dormitory, dorm	(n. or usu. adj.) (part of) a town where commuters live, usually dormitory town (US: bedroom or bedroom community)	(n.) large sleeping-room with many beds,*typically in a boarding school ("a sleeping dormitory"; usu. abbreviated to dorm)	building with many small private rooms, as for housing the students of a college (UK: hall(s) of residence, hostel) dormitory car — railway sleeping car
drape		(v.) to hang limply	(n., usu. pl.) curtain
draw (n.)		an act of drawing, or something drawn a game result in which no player/team wins (also tie) to suck smoke from a cigarette etc.	a ditch that draws water off an area of land a shallow valley or gully. (n.)
dresser (furniture)	a type of cupboard or sideboard esp. for kitchen utensils *		a chest of drawers, usu. with a looking glass (mirror) (UK: dressing-table)
drop (of liquid)	several (fluid) ounces ("just a drop of tea, please") (meiotic usage)	droplet (less than a milliliter)	
duck	a score of zero by a batsman in cricket, supposedly derived from the zero-like shape of a duck's egg. Hence to "break one's duck": to score one's first run. cf. US: "get the monkey off one's back" a term of endearment	(n.) a bird of the family Anatidae (v.) to lower the head or body suddenly, to dodge (v.) to plunge under the surface of water (n.) a heavy cotton fabric	(v.) Leaving very quickly. "He ducked out like five minutes ago"
duff	of poor quality non-functional (up the duff) pregnant (slang, originally Australian)	a type of pudding coal dust	vegetable matter on the forest floor buttocks
dummy	rubber teat for babies (US: pacifier), a feint (esp. in association football)	mannequin, especially for automobile crash tests fake, usu. legal idiot (slang) the contract bridge player who faces his hand after the bidding/auction	
dungarees		sturdy protective bib trousers (cf. s.v. bib overall)	(slightly dated) jeans (blue denim jeans)
duplex		composed of two parts two direction (electronical signalling)	(or duplex house) an often vertically divided two-family dwelling * (or duplex apartment) an apartment on two levels * (duplex locomotive) a large steam locomotive with two sets of driving wheels

== E ==
Word	British English meanings	Meanings common to British and American English	American English meanings
earth	safety connection of an electrical circuit, or to connect (an electrical device) to this (US: ground)	the planet Earth soil the burrow of some animals	
efficiency		the quality of being efficient	(or efficiency apartment) a minimal often furnished apartment, similar to a studio apartment (UK: compare bedsit)
el	(L) letter identifying a learner driver; see L-plate	the letter L	an elevated railway (as that of Chicago or the now-defunct Third Avenue El in New York City)
elevator		flap on the back of an aeroplane used to control pitch moving belt to transport grain, hay bales, etc.	platform or cage moved vertically in a shaft to transport people and goods to various floors in a building (UK: lift) building for grain storage (in full grain elevator) (UK: silo)
elk	moose (Alces alces), the largest species of deer		wapiti (Cervus canadensis), the second largest species of deer
engaged (adj.)	in use – of a toilet/bathroom stall (US: occupied; but the opposite is vacant in both); of a telephone line (US & UK also: busy), hence engaged tone (US: busy signal)	committed; involved in something betrothed	
English		of or pertaining to England the English language	(adj.) the foot-pound-second system of units (UK: Imperial); English (n.) spin placed on a ball in cue sports (UK: side)
engineer	a technician or a person who mends and operates machinery	one employed to design, build or repair equipment practitioner of engineering	one who operates an engine, esp. a locomotive (UK: engine driver)
entrée	starter (q.v.) of a meal (traditionally, the course served between the fish and the joint, but now used for any starter)	(usu. "the entrée") right of entry, insider-type access	main course of a meal
estate	any defined area of real property, as in housing estate (US: subdivision), council estate (US: housing project) or trading estate (US: industrial park) car with van-shaped body (US: station wagon)	grounds of a large piece of real property which features a mansion and beautiful landscaping; property left by a deceased person	
evergreen		non-deciduous, a non-deciduous plant eternally youthful, new etc.	(n.) branchlets or sprigs of an evergreen tree, usually a conifer such as pine, spruce or fir, often used as a Christmas decoration wrapped around human-made structures
expiration		the exhalation of breath	(UK: expiry)

== F ==
Word	British English meanings	Meanings common to British and American English	American English meanings
faculty		division of a university, dealing with a specific group of disciplines (e.g. faculty of arts)	academic staff of a school, college or university
fag	cigarette (slang) * (in England; obs.) young public schoolboy who acted as a servant for older pupils drudgery, chore ("it is such a fag – I come back tired to death" – J. Austen)		male homosexual; vulgar slur (short for faggot)*
faggot	kind of meatball (see faggot (food)), old musical instrument similar to the bassoon (often spelled faggott)	male homosexual; vulgar slur (see faggot (slang)), bundle of sticks, usu. for use as firewood (old-fashioned; often spelled fagot)	
fall	to become pregnant. (as in 'I fell pregnant');	descend or tumble become sick, come down with an illness ("he fell ill") (uncommon in US) prove attractive ("fall for someone", "fall in love")	autumn
fancy (v.)	(v.) exhibit a fondness or preference for something; exhibit an interest in or willingness to: date/court someone, commit some act, or accept some item of trade		US colloq. equiv. of "to fancy" is "to like" something or someone (or regarding tastes and preferences, "to love"); "fancy" as a verb is now used in the US almost solely by UK ex-pats, but was once oft-used by Southern gentility (landed gentry)
fancy dress	a costume worn to impersonate a well-known character, animal etc., typically at a fancy dress party (US: costume party)		(colloq.) "formal" wear (usu. tuxedos for men and ball gowns for women.)
fanny	vagina (slang), vulva (vulgar slang) (fanny about or fanny around, vulgar slang) to mess about or procrastinate ("Stop fannying about and hit it with the hammer")		buttocks (colloquial); hence fanny pack (UK: bum bag)
featherbed	bed or mattress stuffed with feathers (usually 2 words) (v.) to pamper, to spoil	(v.) to require that more workers are hired than are needed, often by agreement with trade unions	quilt, or comforter, stuffed with feathers for use on top of the mattress (but underneath a sheet and the sleeping person) (UK: mattress topper)
fender		a fire screen a cushioning device to protect the side of a boat, ship, or dock a brand of electric guitar, from its manufacturer, the Fender Musical Instruments Corporation	fender (vehicle): the part of an automobile, motorcycle or other vehicle body that frames a wheel well (UK: mudguard or wing) a frame fitted in front of a vehicle (locomotive or automobile) to absorb shock (UK: bumper – see Bumper (automobile))
fifth		ordinal number 5 one of five equal parts into which something is divided	bottle of spirits ("a fifth of bourbon"), traditionally 1/5 of a US gallon, now the metric near-equivalent of 750 mL to "plead the Fifth (Amendment)", i.e. refuse to testify against oneself in an incriminating manner
filth	(the filth) the police (derogatory slang)	dirt, disgusting substance obscene material	
first degree		the least serious category of burn (see article)	the most serious category of a crime; of murder, carries a lifetime prison- or death-sentence (also informal murder one; see article)
first floor (of a building)	the floor above ground level (US: second floor)		the floor at ground level (often, but not always, the same floor as a building's lobby) (UK: ground floor)
fit (adj.)	(of a person) attractive, sexy (slang)	(of a person) in good physical condition suitable for some purpose (usu. followed by for or to)	
fix (v.)	to make firm, fasten, or attach *(the original sense, no longer very common in US) to set or arrange (as a date) *("A time has been fixed")	to repair (orig. US) to sterilise (an animal) to manipulate usually underhandedly ("To fix a fight by paying a boxer to take a dive.")	to adjust or prepare, esp. food or beverage *("I'll fix you a sandwich") (esp. South) to get ready ("I'm fixing to retire") to get even with (someone) (fix up) to provide
flan	an egg-based, open sweet or savoury tart		flan de leche or crème caramel
flannel	a cloth for washing the face or body (US: washcloth)	particular type of fabric/material used for the manufacture of trousers or suits, but more commonly recognised in America as a fabric used in warm winter night clothes and sheets	
flapjack	flat oat cake (US: granola bar)		pancake
flat	(n.) self-contained housing unit (US: apartment) (adj., of a battery) discharged, exhausted, dead	(adj.) level and smooth structured at a single level, not hierarchical	(n.) a flat tyre/tire * an apartment that occupies the entire floor of a small building (San Francisco and upstate New York); used also in phrases such as railroad flat
flip-flop		a type of footwear a type of electronic circuit	an about-face or U-turn (UK also: about-turn), as in politics
fluid ounce (fl. oz.)	liquid measure equal to 28.41 millilitres		liquid measure equal to 29.57 milliliters
flyover	elevated road section (i.e. long road bridge, US: overpass)		ceremonial aircraft flight (UK: flypast) an elongated left-turn ramp passing over or under the whole highway interchange Flyover country is a term for (unsophisticated, poor, rural) middle America, as distinct from the 'coasts'.
football	(usually) association football (US: soccer). Less frequently applies to Rugby football (espec. Rugby union in English private schools).		American football
footpath	a paved strip for pedestrian use, especially along the side of a road (US: sidewalk)	a narrow trail suitable only for foot traffic	
forty (40)		the number 40	a 40-acre (160,000 m^{2}) parcel of land, specifically one sixteenth of a section, constituting the smallest unit of agricultural land commonly surveyed ("back 40", "front 40"). an undeveloped plot of land (as on a farm, ranch, etc.) of unspecified size. in an urban or youth setting, "a 40-ounce beer".
fourth		next after third (e.g. the fourth person, fourth floor) A musical interval	one of four equal parts into which something is divided (UK & US sometimes also quarter, q.v.). (proper noun, used with the) short for The Fourth of July (America's Independence Day)
fringe	arrangement of locks of hair on the forehead (US: bangs)	the outer area of something a decorative border e.g. on clothing holding an extreme political position ("lunatic fringe")	(rare vulgar; chiefly 1980s) vulva ("He's gonna get some fringe.") q.v., US: trim
frock	(or smock-frock) outer garment formerly common in rural Europe, see also overall (also short frock) indoor garment for children and young girls * a woman's dress or gown (dated) *	habit of monks and friars (also frock coat) a style of gentleman's jacket or coat, cut at knee length, usually worn as an outer garment.	
frog	French person (insulting slang)*	an amphibian part of the mechanism of railway points/a railroad switch	(Slang) A US Navy SEAL. Shortened from "Frogman"
full stop	punctuation mark used at the end of a sentence, sometimes used in speech for emphasis ("Whom does he support? Arsenal, full stop!") (US: period, q.v.)		the state of automobiles barely moving in heavy traffic (also, a "dead stop")
furnace		large hearth or container for heating or melting metal, usually for an industrial process	principal domestic heat source in central heating. (UK: boiler)

== G ==
Word	British English meanings	Meanings common to British and American English	American English meanings
gagging	(especially as in gagging for it) desperate, especially for sex (colloquial)	choking; fighting the urge to vomit ("that was so disgusting, I was gagging")	
gallon	4.54609 litres (about 6/5 of US gallon)		3.78541 liters (about 5/6 of UK gallon)
gangbanger	a participant in a "gang bang", a group sex activity		gang member; group rapist
garage (see also pronunciation differences)	fuel filling station, e.g. "a Texaco garage" (also petrol station, US: gas station) a genre of music	place where vehicles are repaired; building attached to or in the grounds of a residence for storing a car	(parking garage) building serving as a public parking facility (UK: multistorey car park or just multistorey)
garbage (n.)		piece of nonsensical prose, sequence of meaningless words	household waste (UK "rubbish")
garden (n.)	area around a residential structure (US: yard)		area within a yard (land) for growing plants or vegetables (UK: vegetable garden, vegetable patch)
garnish		(n. (v.)) (to add) decorative or savory touches to (food or drink) (v.)to furnish	(v.) to take (as a debtor's wages) by legal authority
gas		(n.) state of matter (see gas) (n.) natural gas (v.) to attack or kill with poisonous gas (state of matter) (v.) to emit gas (state of matter)	(n.) gasoline, hence gas station (UK: petrol) (n.) gas pedal* (may be applied in the UK in the context of a driving lesson, for brevity; UK: accelerator) (n.) flatulence (n.) air trapped in the stomach or intestines (UK: wind)
geezer	gangster, man (esp. Cockney)		old person (derogatory; UK: old geezer [not derog.])
give way	to give the right of way (to vehicles, pedestrians, etc.); hence give way sign (US: yield [the right of way] sign)	to retreat; to break down	
glass	(v.) to hit someone with a broken bottle or drinking glass	(n.) a brittle, hard, transparent substance usually made from sand heated with soda or potash; (n.) drinking vessel made of glass	
glaze		general term for thin shiny coatings applied to food, painted surfaces, clayware, etc.; a glossy surface	a slippery coating of ice (also known as sleet, q.v.); a stretch of ice
gob	(n.) mouth; (v., slang) to spit	lump	a large amount ("gobs of") (slang—little used since the 1940s) a sailor
go down (fig.)	to leave a university (as Oxford) to come down (with an illness)	to be accepted or remembered (e.g. go down in history) to fail, esp. of a computer go down on, to engage in oral sex	to go on, happen (often a major event, e.g. a drug bust "it's going down right now!" or "it went down last week". But also used as a greeting, "What's going down?")
goods	items to be transported (as by railway) ("a goods train") (US & UK also: freight)	useful objects or services; products; merchandising; personal property incriminating evidence ("we have the goods on him")	
gooseberry	supernumerary third person preventing a couple from courting (US: third wheel)	a green hairy summer fruit (Ribes hirtellum in the USA), (Ribes grossularia in Europe)	
governor	boss (sometimes shortened to guv'nor), colloquial	a local official	the top official in a US state
government	the cabinet or executive branch (US: the administration) the political party supporting the cabinet in parliament	the act or office of governing	the collective agency through which government is exercised (UK: the state) all such individual agencies (UK: the public sector)
grade (education)	a level of music examination ("Guitar grade 4"). Usually refers to ABRSM or Trinity College London examinations.	(n. & v.) teacher's assessment of a student's work (UK also mark)	level or year of a student in elementary, middle, or high school ("in 10th grade") (UK equiv.: year); hence grader, a student in a specified grade ("a 10th grader") (grade school, the grades) elementary school see also Grade Point Average
grade (other)		(n.) a rating, degree, or level; (v.) to lay out in grades [US meaning generated grade separation and the idiom make the grade]	(n.) slope, gradient, or elevation; also ground level ("at grade", "over grade"); hence grade crossing (UK: level crossing) (v.) to level (as a roadbed), hence grader, construction machine for doing this *
graduate (v.) (education) graduate (adj.) (education)	to finish university with a degree relating to a student at the point of gaining, or who has recently completed, a degree	to move from a lower to higher stage; to effect change in steps; to mark with units of measurement or other divisions.	to finish studying at any educational institution by passing relevant examinations relating to a student taking a higher degree (UK equiv.: "postgraduate"), e.g. graduate school
graft	hard work	to join or connect two separate but similar items (typically in biology, especially medicine and horticulture)	a form of political-economic corruption
grass	an informant (often to the police) (to grass on) to tell on somebody (US: to squeal, narc)	green ground cover marijuana	grazing; to feed (livestock) with grass (UK: at grass, to put out to grass)
grammar school	a type of secondary school, normally a selective state funded school		elementary school (less common today)
grill	to cook directly under a dry heat source (US: broil)	to question intensely (informal). to interrogate.	to cook over a gas or coal fire (UK and US: barbecue) a flat cooking surface a restaurant (freq. as "bar and grill")
ground floor (of a building)		the floor at ground level (US usu.: first floor)	lower of two floors that are each at a different ground level due to sloping terrain (UK: lower ground floor)
guard	the official in charge of a railway train (US & now UK also: conductor)	to watch over for security one who guards a protective device one of two positions in basketball, usually players who are the best ball-handlers and shooters. Usually smaller than the forwards or center. Most common division is between point guards (playmakers) and shooting guards (more often score-first).	military division used to help the country after a disaster in (American) football, one of two offensive positions on either side of the center or a defensive position across from the center (nose-guard)
guff	extraneous or useless things, ideas, or paperwork/documentation; also to break wind ("Have you guffed, Dr Watson?")		nonsense, insolent talk, back talk
gum	cement consisting of a sticky substance that is used as an adhesive (US usually: glue)	a type of confectionery composed of chicle used for chewing the soft tissue around the teeth, or to chew something with no teeth (also, gum at)	
gutted	disappointed and upset (informal)	past tense of gut: eviscerated; plundered; despoiled; made powerless or ineffectual (of a building) stripped of interior structure, leaving only frame and exterior walls (e.g.by fire)	
gyro	(see also giro)	gyroscope a sandwich, the Greek gyro	

== H ==
Word	British English meanings	Meanings common to British and American English	American English meanings
haberdasher	a dealer in small items and accessories, as for sewing; hence haberdashery (US: notions)		a dealer in men's apparel and accessories; hence haberdashery
half	half pint of beer, cider or lager a single measure of whisky or other distilled spirit (used mostly in Scotland, derived from the Scots word 'hauf')	fifty percent/0.5 times.	large bottle of spirits ("a half of bourbon"), traditionally 1/2 of a US gallon, now the metric near-equivalent of 1750 mL; also "handle" as such large bottles often have a handle
halfway house	a place where victims of child abuse, orphans or teenage runaways can stay, a shelter	drug rehabilitation or sex offender centre. (Archaic) An inn halfway between two towns, still seen in many pub names.	a place for ex-convicts to live while readjusting to society.
hamper	large basket for food (especially picnic hamper, Christmas hamper)	to impede or hinder	basket for clothes that need washing (UK: Linen basket or laundry basket)
hash	number sign, octothorpe (#) (US: pound sign). Also 'to make a hash' of something is to mess it up.	hashish Hash (food), beef and other ingredients mashed together into a coarse paste	
herb		culinary or medicinal herb, leaves of plants used to flavour food or treat ailments	any herbaceous plant
highway	(chiefly in official use) public road; see Highway Code	(highway robbery) something too expensive; see also highwayman	main road (as between cities) (divided or dual highway) a road with two roadways and at least four lanes (UK: dual carriageway, motorway) (highway post office) in the past, a bus transporting mail that was sorted en route
hike		a usu. recreational walk	an increase in amount (as in wages) * (to take a hike) to go away (also used as a command)
hire	to rent moveable property (e.g. a car) *; rental (hire purchase) a purchase carried out over time by making regular payments (US: installment plan)	to employ, recruit *	a person who is recruited
hob	the flat top surface of a cooking stove (US: cooktop) a part of a fireplace an elf	trouble (as in "raising hob" – chiefly US) (UK has less common "playing hob")	
hock	a German wine ("down their four-and-twenty throats went four-and-twenty imperial pints of such rare old hock" – Charles Dickens) (US: Rhine wine); Hocktide, an ancient holiday	hock (zoology)	pawn (n. & v.) ("I can borrow a dime from the barber, an' I got enough junk to hock for a blowout" – Jack London); prison (both from Dutch) * debt the end of a smoked ham * to hock-a-loogie, to spit (esp. mucus as opposed to saliva).
hockey	hockey played with a ball on grass (field hockey) *	hockey played on a hard surface (e.g. concrete) or indoors	hockey played on ice with a puck (ice hockey) *
hog	(dialect, also hogg) a yearling sheep	adult pig, esp. domesticated, castrated male reared for slaughter to take more than one's fair share of something (road hog) motorist who holds up other traffic by driving slowly or out of lane; any bad driver	motorcycle, especially a large one such as a Harley-Davidson (derived from Harley Owners Group, a club for Harley-Davidson motorcycle owners.)
hole-in-the-wall	automated teller machine, cash machine (informal)		a small, out-of-the-way place, as a restaurant, with a negative connotation. However, often used to preface a compliment, e.g. "just a hole-in-the-wall place you've never heard of, but they serve the best steak in the city."
holiday	see Bank holiday (often pl.) time taken off from work, school, etc., including the period between school terms (US: break, vacation) recreational trip away from home (US: vacation)	day when people are generally exempt from work, school, etc.	see Federal holidays in the United States (the Holidays) the days comprising Christmas and New Year's Day (and Hanukkah), and often also Thanksgiving (used esp. in the phrase "happy Holidays") festival, whether or not generally entailing a public holiday: "Halloween is my favorite holiday"
home	(noun): condition of domesticity, or one's permanent and regular shelter, but not the physical structure or property.		In AmE widely used also to mean the physical structure and property, and references to them, e.g., "home loans", "homeowners", and "tract homes". This usage is overwhelmingly predominant in commercial language and public discourse, e.g. "the home mortgage crisis".
home run	final part of a distance, final effort needed to finish (US: homestretch)	a success (from baseball)	(also homer) a four-base hit in baseball (slang) sexual intercourse; more s.v. base
homely	(of a house) comfortable, cozy, rustic (US: homey) (of a person) home-loving, domesticated, house-proud		(only used of a person) plain, ugly
hood	the folding fabric top on a convertible car (US: convertible top)	head covering forming part of a garment component of academic regalia	hinged cover over the engine in a car (UK: bonnet) a contraction of neighborhood, especially regarding a poor neighborhood short for hoodlum, a tough, destructive young man, or generically any criminal
hoo-ha	argument		female genitalia
hooker	in rugby football, the player position in the centre front of the scrum		prostitute (informal) *
hooter	steam whistle or siren in a factory or other large workplace sounded as a signal for beginning or ceasing work car horn nose		(hooters) female breasts (vulgar slang)
hull	(Hull) Kingston-upon-Hull, a large city in the north-east of England*	the outer skin of a ship, tank, aeroplane, etc.	the seed-case of various edible plants (maize, nuts, etc.) (v.t.) to remove the seed-case from (a nut, etc.) hulled (adj.) (of a nut, etc.) having the seed-case removed (UK: shelled)
hump	a state of depression (dated) ("to be in a hump") a state of annoyance ("to get the hump") a traffic calming tool ("a speed hump") *(US & UK: speed bump) to move a heavy load by human effort a short distance	a rounded mass sticking out from its surroundings (v., vulgar slang) engage in sexual intercourse, animals breeding or trying to breed see also Glossary of rail terminology	(n. & v.) (to make) a vigorous effort ("hump yourself", "to get a hump on") (regional) (n.) a mountain barrier to be crossed (as by air) (hump day) Wednesday

== I ==
Word	British English meanings	Meanings common to British and American English	American English meanings
icebox		cabinet containing ice for food refrigeration	refrigerator
ice pop	a water-based frozen snack served in a plastic sleeve (US: freeze pop, freezer pop, Icee)		a water-based frozen snack on a stick (UK: ice lolly)
Indian corn		Zea mays (historical or technical; usually, UK maize or sweetcorn, US corn, q.v.)	A particular variety of maize/corn, with multicolored kernels, used for decorations
indicator	direction-indicator light on a vehicle (US: turn signal)	one that indicates	
inspector (police)	lowest supervisory rank above sergeant (rough US equivalent: lieutenant)		senior rank in some police departments (rough UK equivalent: superintendent)
inside lane	the part of the road nearest the edge, used especially by slower-moving vehicles (US: outside lane)	(in both cases the term applies to the lane in the direction concerned)	the part of the road nearest the vehicles going in the opposite direction, used especially by faster vehicles (UK: outside lane)
intern	(n.) (rare or obsolete) a person living in an institution; esp. a pupil who is resident at a school, a boarder. The American graduate usage is becoming more common in the UK, sometimes replacing the term "work placement".	(v.) to confine (as during a war, or to a hospital) (adj., archaic) internal	(n.) one (as a graduate or college student) temporarily employed for practical training, e.g. in the science, engineering, or technology fields; esp., in the medical field, a physician (rough UK equivalent: houseman) in their first year of postgraduate training (v.) to work as an intern
international	a contest between national sports teams or representatives; a member of such a team	Pertaining to or common to more than one country.	Foreign, not from the US. ("International version of software for country xxx", in British English this is a contradiction in terms.)
interval	break between two performances or sessions, as in theatre (US: intermission)	a gap in space or time; see interval (music), interval (mathematics), interval (time)	(esp. New England, also spelled intervale) low-lying land, as near a river (US also bottomland)
inventory		itemisation of goods or objects (of an estate, in a building, etc.)	the stock of an item on hand in a store or shop the process of producing an inventory in a store or shop (UK: stocktaking)
IRA	Irish Republican Army [not abbreviated in US without context]		Individual Retirement Account

== J ==
Word	British English meanings	Meanings common to British and American English	American English meanings
jab	an injection with a hypodermic needle, as in the case of an inoculation (US: shot)	(informal) to stab, thrust, or penetrate. biting remark, sarcasm. a straight punch used in various martial arts	
janitor	an officer in a Masonic Chapter (specialist language)	a person employed to oversee the cleaning and security of a public building, e.g. a school.	a person employed to oversee the cleaning and security of a building (UK: caretaker, especially for private residences; for schools etc. janitor is also used in the UK)
jelly	a fruit flavoured dessert set with gelatin (US: Jell-O (trademark)) a type of condiment, e.g. mint jelly	a clear or translucent preserve made from the liquid of fruits boiled in sugar and set with pectin, specifically without pieces of fruit (e.g. 'crab apple jelly')	(occasionally) fruit preserve with fruit pieces (UK: Jam)
Jersey	A British Crown dependency off the coast of France. Also, a kind of buttonless, pullover shirt.	An athlete's uniform shirt, also called a kit in British English.	A colloquial term for the state of New Jersey
Jesse	(often as Big Jesse, derogatory insult for a man) Non-macho, effeminate, sometimes gay.	A male name (uncommon in the UK). A shortening of the female name Jessica (usually spelled "Jessie").	
jock	a Scotsman (slang) a Scottish private soldier (slang) (UK: squaddie)		slang term for an athlete slang term for the undergarment called an athletic supporter or jockstrap
joint	piece of meat for carving * (slang) hand-rolled cigarette containing cannabis and tobacco	connection between two objects or bones an establishment, especially a disreputable one ("a gin joint"; "let's case the joint") (slang, orig. US)	(slang) hand-rolled cigarette containing only cannabis (slang) prison ("in the joint")
jolly	very (informal) (as in jolly good) an excursion or trip, usually at another's expense ("off on a jolly")	happy; jovial	
jug	any container with a handle and a mouth or spout for liquid (US: pitcher)	(jugs) breasts (slang)	large container with a narrow mouth and handle for liquids (similar to UK pitcher)
jumper	a knitted upper body garment (US: sweater)	jump shot in basketball Non-permanent electrical connection, especially on a PCB	pinafore dress jump suit jumper cable
jumping jack	a form of jumping firework	a toy figure whose limbs are moved by string or a stick	a form of exercise (UK star jump)
just	(When used at the end of a sentence, as in: "I survived, but only just") barely	fair, equitable merely, simply, exactly, barely (when used before word it modifies)	

== K ==
Word	British English meanings	Meanings common to British and American English	American English meanings
kebab	commonly a döner kebab (sometimes doner or donner kebab), strips of meat (usu. lamb or chicken) grilled by being heated on a revolving device and served stuffed in a pita bread (In the US, the Greek varieties souvlaki or gyro are better known than the Turkish döner)	(often spelled "kabob" in the US) meat served on a skewer together with onions, tomatoes, etc. (e.g. shish kebab)	
keen	very low or competitive (price)	eager or intent on, example: he is keen to get to work on time.	desirable or just right, example: "peachy keen" – "That's a pretty keen outfit you're wearing." (slang going out of common usage)
keeper	a curator or a goalkeeper	one that keeps (as a gamekeeper or a warden)	a type of play in American football ("Quarterback keeper") a person well-suited for a successful, usu. romantic, relationship. (Don't let him go—he's a keeper) something of significance ("that's a keeper"). Can be used in many contexts. Often used in sports fishing to refer to a fish not released.
kit	clothing, esp. a sports uniform (e.g. football kit)	any of various sets of equipment or tools a set of parts to be assembled, e.g. into a scale model	a group of person or objects ("the whole kit and (ca) boodle/billing")
kitty		affectionate term for a housecat collective source of funds (esp. for a group of people)	piggy bank vagina (vulgar slang) ("Singin' 'hey diddle diddle' with your kitty in the middle" – Aerosmith, Walk this Way)
knickers	women's underwear (US: panties)		knickerbockers
knob	The penis, or specifically the glans (slang, vulgar)	a rounded door handle fool, idiot, dim-witted person	
knock over		to tip over something to cause an object to fall over.	to rob (esp. a store, slang) ("He knocked over a gas station.")
knock up	to practise before tennis to awaken or summon by knocking to call on the telephone	to prepare quickly ("Knock us up something to eat" — L.M. Alcott) to impregnate, esp. unintentionally* (slang, sometimes vulgar)	

== L ==
Word	British English meanings	Meanings common to British and American English	American English meanings
ladder	a run (vertical split) in the fabric of tights	a vertical or inclined set of rungs or steps.	
lavatory	toilet	closet in passenger vehicles (e.g. trains) containing a toilet and washbasin/sink.	washbasin, place for washing
lay by (v.), lay-by (n.)	(n.) roadside parking or rest area for drivers (US: rest stop)	(v.) to lay aside to stow	(n.) a last cultivating in the growing of a crop (v.) to cultivate (a crop) for the last time
lead	(rhyming with "speed") a cable (US: cord), or a dog's leash	to guide through (rhymes with 'dead') chemical element Pb	(n.) a clue or potential source of information (esp. in context of journalistic investigation) *
leader	newspaper editorial main violin in an orchestra (US: concertmaster) see also Leader of the Opposition	one who leads	a pipe for carrying water ("rain water leader")
lecturer	the entry-level academic rank at a university (below Senior Lecturer, Reader, and Professor). Largely equivalent to "Assistant Professor" at a US university	someone who gives a lecture	an academic position at a university that is teaching-focused and not tenure-track (as opposed to assistant professor, Associate Professor, or Professor)
legless	extremely drunk (informal)	having no legs	
lemonade	clear, carbonated, lemon-flavoured drink similar to Sprite and 7 Up (lemon and lime flavoured)		non-carbonated drink made by mixing lemon juice, sugar, and water (UK: traditional lemonade)
let	to rent out (as real property, and denoting the transaction from the owner's perspective); Tenants "take" or "rent" the property being let. *("rooms to let") (n.) the act of renting; rented premises (let out) to reveal	allow, give permission. leave (as in let him be or let it be) ease (as in let up on the accelerator) indicate (as in don't let on) a first bad serve which is allowed to be retaken, as in tennis, table tennis, and volleyball	(let out) to end (of school, meetings, etc.)
levee	an early afternoon assembly held by the King or Queen, to which only men were admitted (Always levée, with accent)	a reception in honour of a particular person	an embankment on a river (as the Mississippi River) the steep bank of a river, or border of an irrigated field (esp. Southern & Western US) a landing place or quay
leverage		mechanical advantage of a lever	take advantage of a capability (business) the use of debt finance (UK: gearing)* knowledge not immediately revealed to be used to one's advantage *
liberal (politics)	a person who generally supports the ideas of the UK Liberal Democrats, a centrist to centre-left party	a person who holds the political ideals of Liberalism	a person who advocates modern liberalism; see also Liberalism in the United States for historic background; also, a progressive, a radical, or (sometimes) a socialist
life preserver	a type of weapon for self-defence (US: blackjack)		life vest, personal flotation device (UK: lifebelt or lifejacket)
lift (n.)	platform or cage moved vertically in a shaft to transport people and goods to various floors in a building (US: elevator)	ride as a passenger in a vehicle (as in, to give someone a lift) item placed in shoe to increase the height of the wearer, normally plural (lifts, elevator shoes)	an elevation in mood, "I got a lift just talking with her."
line	(see also track)	a breadthless length An amount of powdered drug (usually cocaine) drawn out for the purpose of snorting through a straw	a group of persons, usually waiting for something, arranged in order of arrival (UK: queue) a lie, short for a line of bull a phrase used for hitting on women, short for pickup line to hit a line drive (a hard straight shot) in baseball
liquor	the broth resulting from the prolonged cooking of meat or vegetables. Green liquor is traditionally served with pie and mash in the East End of London		a distilled beverage * (hard liquor) strongly alcoholic beverage; spirits (liquor store) retail establishment selling liquor (usu. for consumption off the premises) (UK similar: off-licence) ("I held up and robbed a hard liquor store" – Paul Simon) (malt liquor) a type of beer with high alcohol content
loaded		the state of a firearm with bullets or shells in its firing chamber. bearing a load. (slang; of a person) rich	drunk or high
lolly	Frozen water-based dessert on a stick (US: popsicle, ice pop (q.v.))	(short for lollipop) candy on a stick	
lot		(a lot) a great deal a number of things (or, informal, people) taken collectively fate, fortune a prize in a lottery (the lot) the whole thing	a measured plot of land; a portion of land set for a particular purpose ("a building lot"), e.g. for parking ("parking lot") or selling ("used car lot") automotive vehicles. But also a "vacant lot" a film studio
lounge	a room for relaxation and entertainment in a house (lounge bar) part of a pub	a room for relaxation in a public place	a bar
love (in addressing people)	informal term of address	beloved person, darling (often a term of endearment)	
loveseat	a seat which accommodates two people facing in opposite directions. Can be wooden or padded.		a two-seater couch
lox		liquid oxygen (engineering)	thin-sliced smoked salmon, commonly consumed on bagels; Yiddish from German 'Lachs', salmon.
lugs (n.)	ears (lugholes)	a small projection (engineering)	a lug nut fastens a wheel to the hub, (UK wheel nut). a "big lug" is usually a term of endearment for a large shy, goofy man.
lumber	(n.) disused items (as furniture)*; hence lumber room (v.) to encumber (as with such items) ("I was lumbered with work")	(v.) to move awkwardly or heavily ("he lumbered out the door")	(n.) timber that has been sawed and (partly) prepared for construction or woodworking; hence lumberyard (UK: timberyard), lumber camp, lumberjack, lumberman, lumber wagon, lumber town, etc. (v.) to log and prepare timber to make a rolling sound (dated)
lush (slang; of a person)	attractive (usu. used by women in reference to men – principally West Country)	luxuriant	an alcoholic *especially female

== See also ==
- List of words having different meanings in British and American English: M–Z
- List of American words not widely used in the United Kingdom
- List of British words not widely used in the United States
