= Territorial losses of Germany in the 20th century =

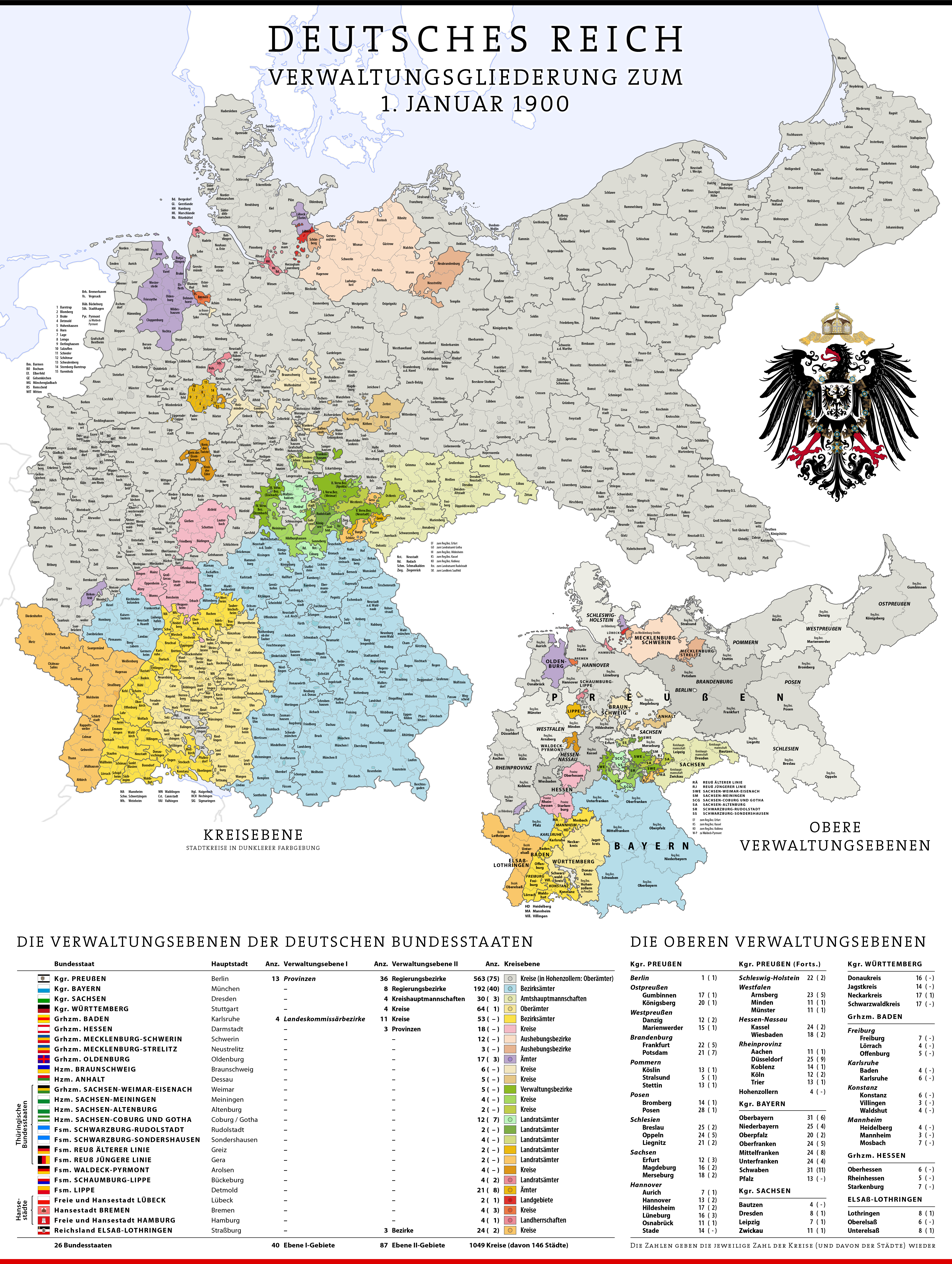
Administrative divisions of the German Empire in 1900

This article lists territories, administrative divisions, and populated places that were part of the German Empire, the Weimar Republic, and Nazi Germany, but were transferred to other countries as a result of the First and Second World Wars.

== After World War I ==
=== Europe ===
Territorial losses of Germany in Europe after the First World War

The tables below list the territorial changes of Germany following the First World War, namely the administrative units (German: Kreise) that Germany lost in accordance with the Treaty of Versailles. In some cases, larger administrative units (German: Bezirke) are also included.

==== Alsace and Lorraine ====
Alsace and Lorraine (in the German Empire — the Imperial Territory of Alsace-Lorraine, German: Reichsland Elsaß-Lothringen) were lost to France, namely:

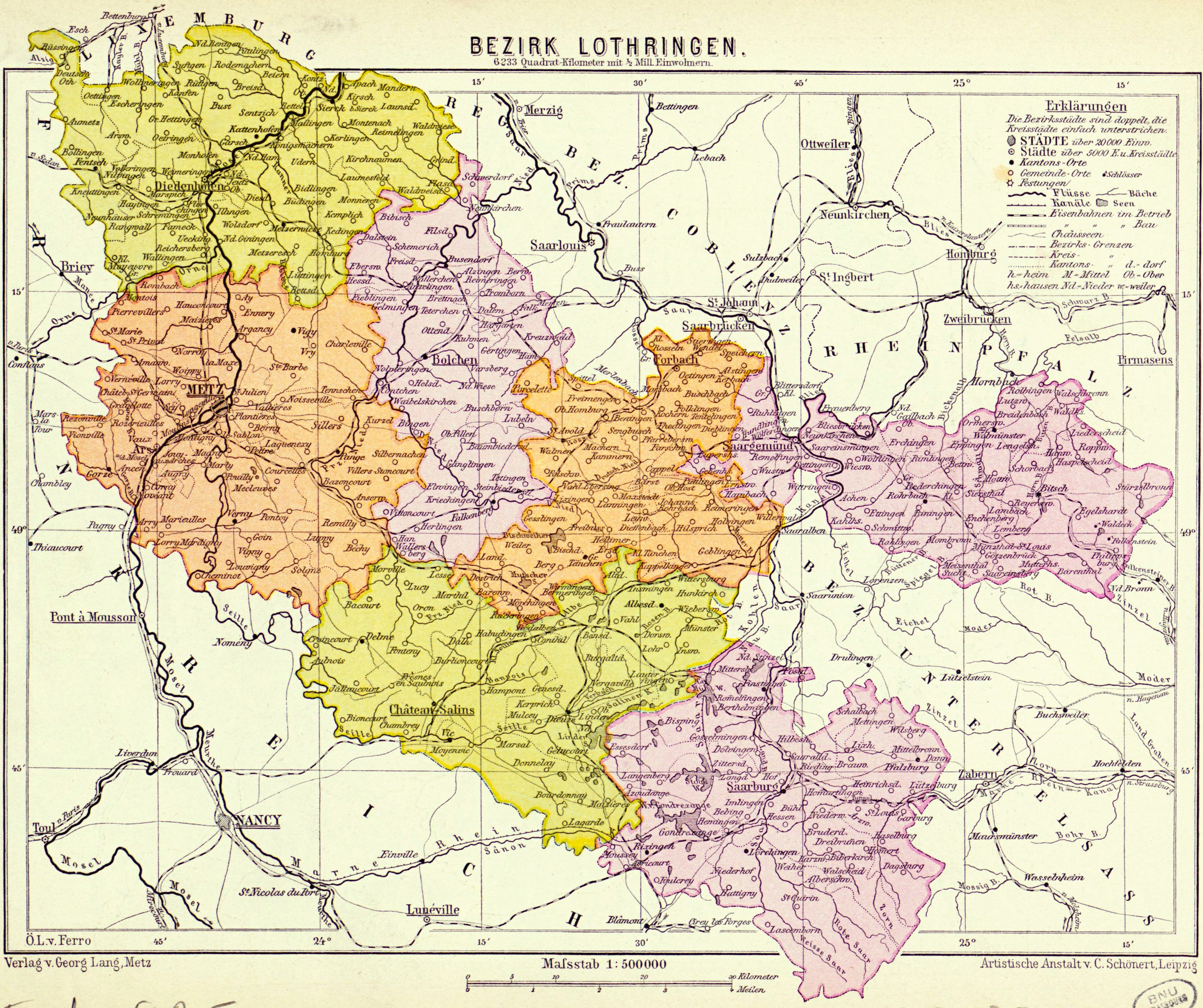
Map of Lorraine in Germany

===== Lorraine =====
The district of Lorraine (German: Bezirk Lothringen) with its capital in the city of Metz, consisting of the following administrative districts (German: Kreise):

District (Kreis)	Capital
Urban district of Metz (German: Stadtkreis Metz) and surrounding area (German: Landkreis Metz)	Metz
District of Bolchen (German: Kreis Bolchen)	Boulay-Moselle
District of Château-Salins (German: Kreis Château-Salins)	Château-Salins
District of Diedenhofen (German: Kreis Diedenhofen), divided in 1901 into Western and Eastern parts	Thionville
District of Forbach (German: Kreis Forbach)	Forbach
District of Saarburg (German: Kreis Saarburg)	Sarrebourg
District of Saargemünd (German: Kreis Saargemünd)	Sarreguemines

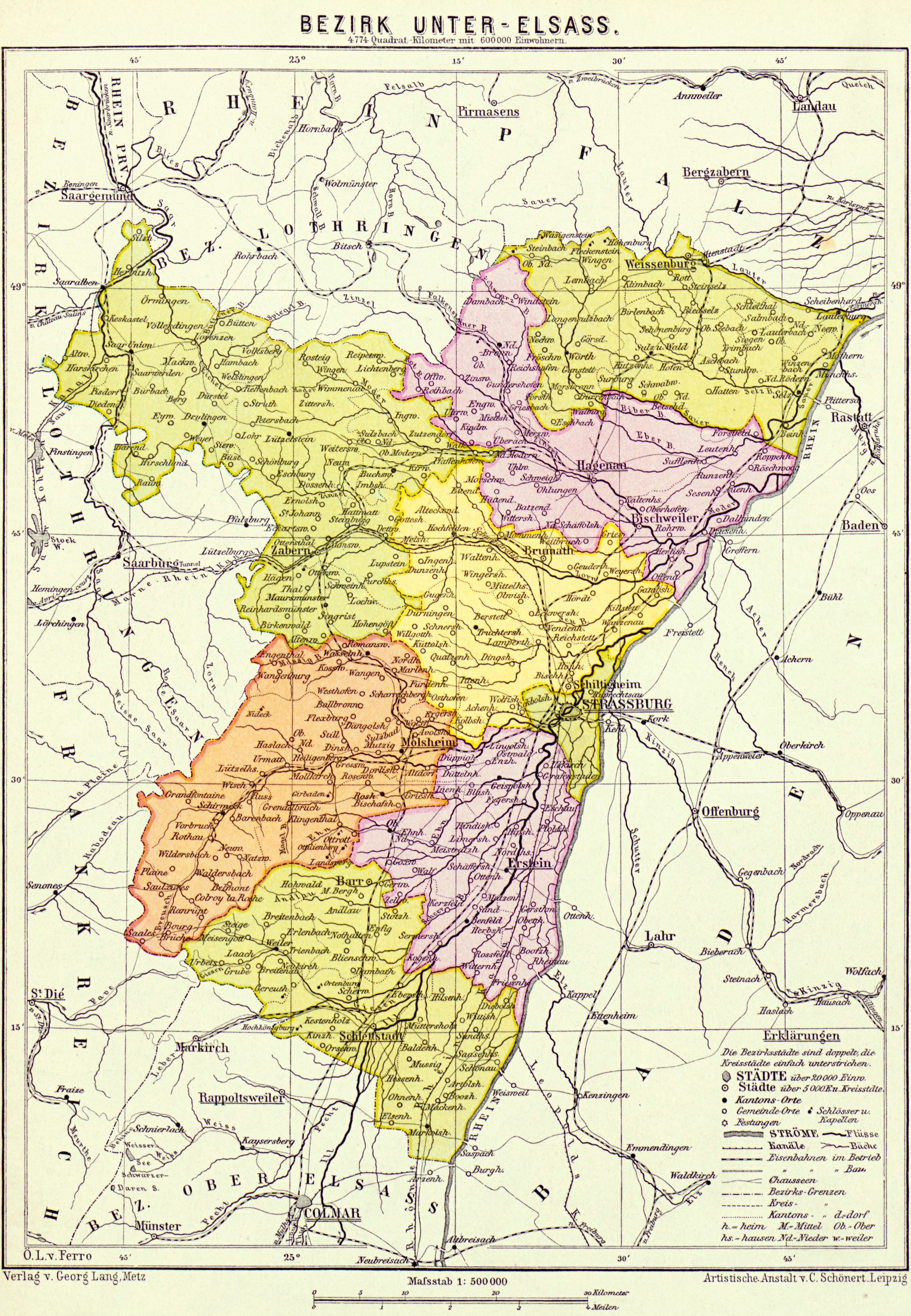
Map of Lower Alsace in the German Empire

===== Lower Alsace =====
Lower Alsace (German: Bezirk Unterelsaß) with its capital in the city of Strasbourg, consisting of the following districts (German: Kreise):

District (Kreis)	Capital
District of Erstein (German: Kreis Erstein)	Erstein
District of Hagenau (German: Kreis Hagenau)	Haguenau
District of Molsheim (German: Kreis Molsheim)	Molsheim
District of Schlettstadt (German: Kreis Schlettstadt)	Sélestat
District of Strasbourg (German: Kreis Straßburg) and surrounding area (German: Landkreis Straßburg)	Strasbourg
District of Weißenburg (German: Kreis Weißenburg)	Wissembourg
District of Zabern (German: Kreis Zabern)	Saverne

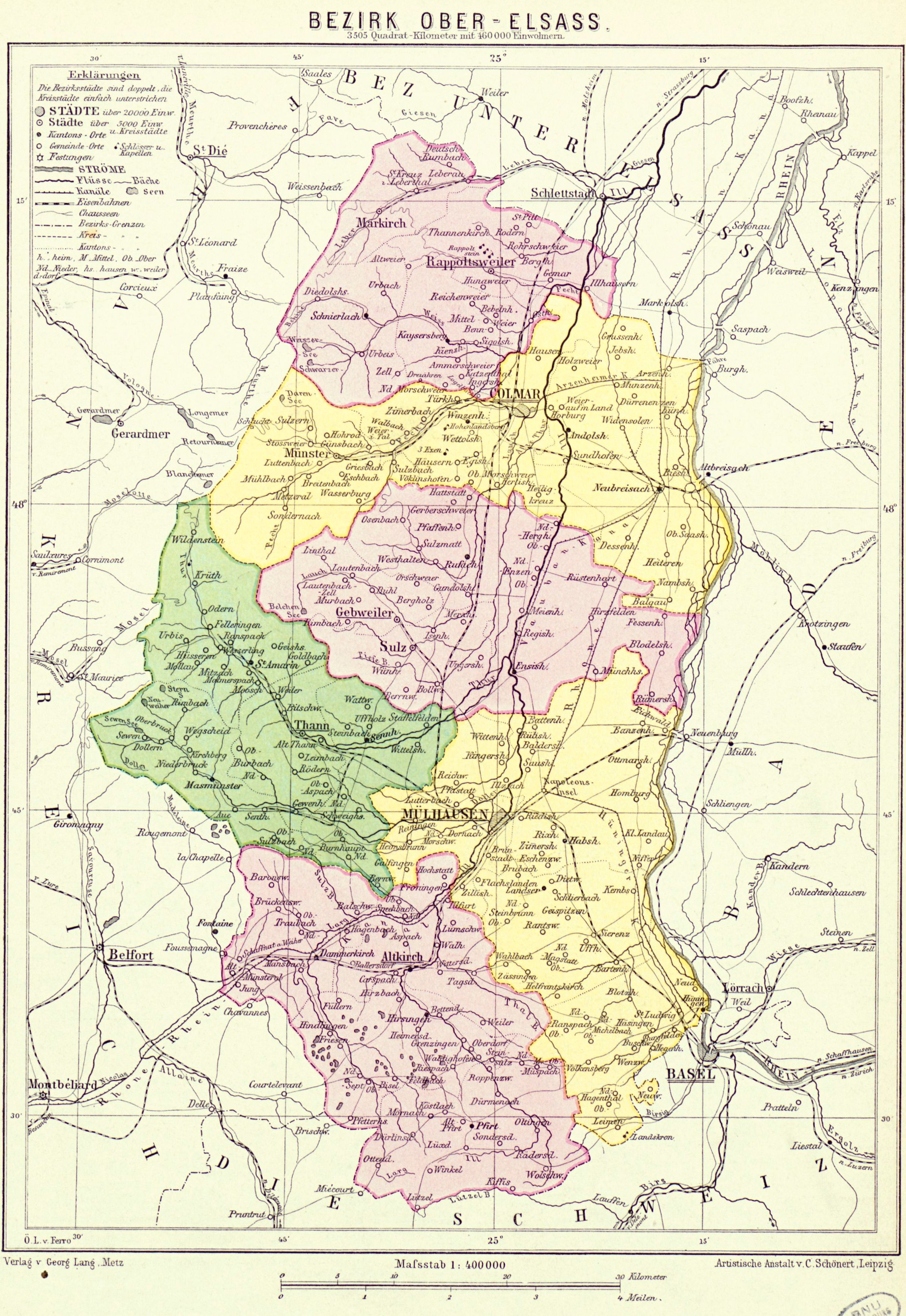
Map of Upper Alsace in the German Empire

===== Upper Alsace =====
Upper Alsace (German: Bezirk Oberelsaß) with its capital in the city of Colmar, consisting of the following districts (German: Kreise):

District (Kreis)	Capital
District of Altkirch (German: Kreis Altkirch)	Altkirch
District of Colmar (German: Kreis Colmar)	Colmar
District of Gebweiler (German: Kreis Gebweiler)	Guebwiller
District of Mülhausen (German: Kreis Mülhausen)	Mulhouse
District of Rappoltsweiler (German: Kreis Rappoltsweiler)	Ribeauvillé
District of Thann (German: Kreis Thann)	Thann

==== Saar ====
Saar was placed under the administration of the League of Nations as a result of the First World War (in 1935, following a referendum, the Saar was returned to Nazi Germany).

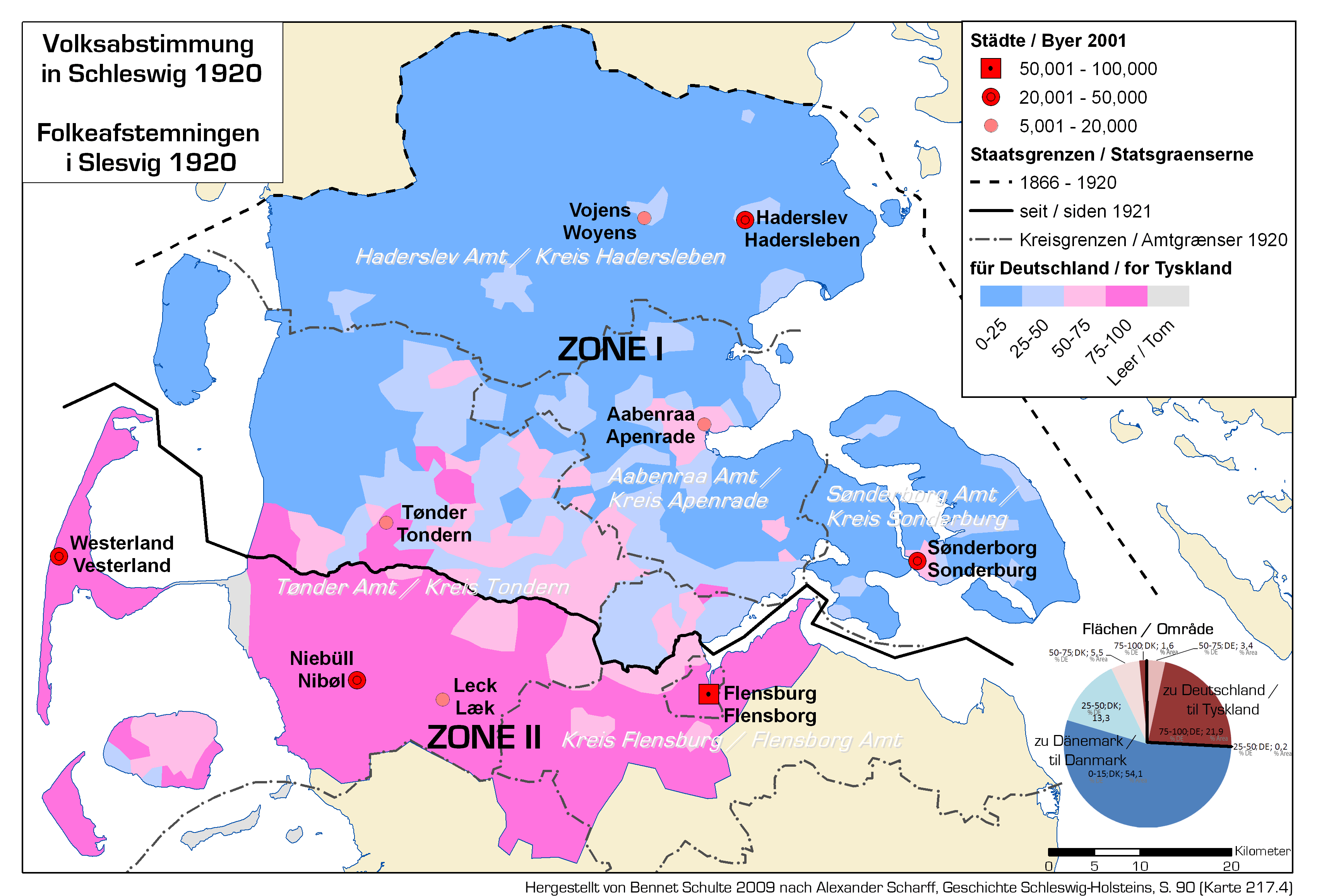
Results of the 1920 plebiscite in Northern Schleswig. The dashed line indicates the Danish–German border after the Second Schleswig War of 1864, while the solid black line marks the modern border

==== Schleswig ====
Schleswig was divided between Germany and Denmark following two referendums — Northern Schleswig was returned to Denmark, namely:

District (Kreis)	Capital
District of Hadersleben (German: Kreis Hadersleben)	Haderslev
District of Apenrade (German: Kreis Apenrade)	Aabenraa
District of Sonderburg (German: Kreis Sonderburg)	Sønderborg
District of Tondern (German: Kreis Tondern) (partially transferred to Denmark; the southern part remained in Germany)	Tønder

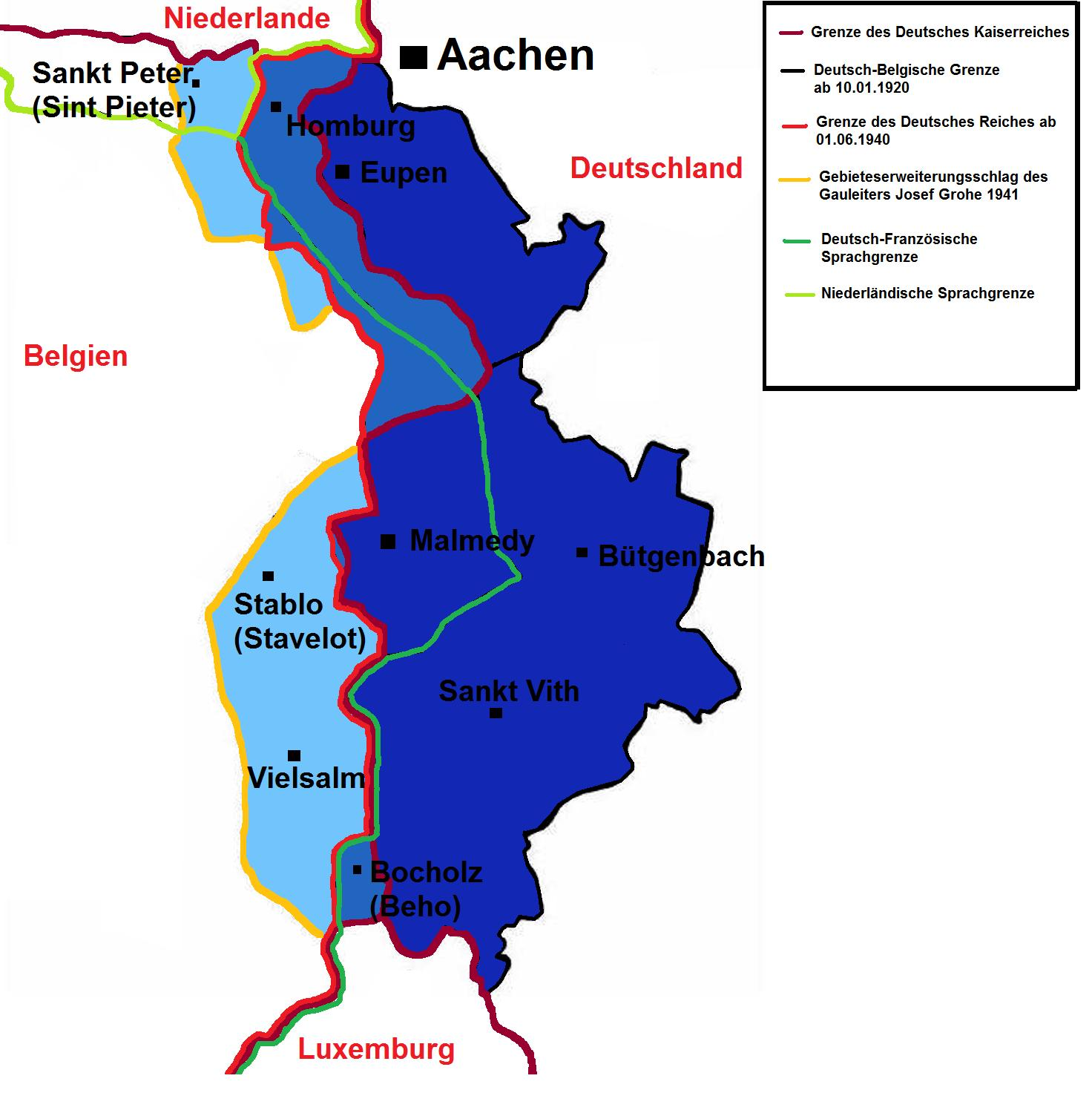
Border of Germany prior to 1918 marked in burgundy

==== Eupen and Malmedy ====
Eupen and Malmedy (near Aachen) were transferred to Belgium (Note: Article 34).

District (Kreis)	Capital
District of Eupen (German: Kreis Eupen)	Eupen
District of Malmedy (German: Kreis Malmedy)	Malmedy

==== Province of Posen (partially) ====
Most of the Province of Posen was transferred to the re-established Poland. A part of the former province of Posen remained within Germany during the interwar period, becoming part of the Prussian province of Province of Posen–West Prussia.

Administratively, the province of Posen in the German Empire was divided into two administrative regions (German: Regierungsbezirk) — the Regierungsbezirk of Posen and the Regierungsbezirk of Bromberg.

Province of Posen within the German Empire before the First World War. Orange — Regierungsbezirk of Posen, green — Regierungsbezirk of Bromberg

===== Regierungsbezirk Posen =====
From the Regierungsbezirk of Posen, the following territories were transferred to Poland:

In the upper part of the image, territories remaining within Germany as a result of the First World War are shown. The district of Meseritz within the newly established province of Posen–West Prussia, which became part of the Weimar Republic

District (Kreis)	Capital
Urban district of Posen (German: Stadtkreis Posen) with surrounding districts: Posen-East (German: Kreis Posen-Ost), Posen-West (German: Kreis Posen-West)	Poznań
District of Adelnau (German: Kreis Adelnau)	Odolanów
District of Birnbaum (German: Kreis Birnbaum)	Międzychód
District of Bomst (German: Kreis Bomst) (partially: two-thirds of the district of Bomst (740 km^{2}) were transferred to newly created Poland, where they became the Wolsztyn County. The western part of the district of Bomst (297 km^{2}) remaining in Germany, together with the town of Bomst, was incorporated in 1922 into the Prussian province of Posen–West Prussia)	Bomst (at that time remained in Germany, now Polish Babimost)
District of Fraustadt (German: Kreis Fraustadt) (partially: the northeastern third of the district of Fraustadt (215 km^{2}) was transferred to newly created Poland, where it became part of the Wschowa County. In 1922, the German part became part of the Prussian province of Posen–West Prussia)	Fraustadt (at that time remained in Germany, now Polish Wschowa)
District of Gostyn (German: Kreis Gostyn)	Gostyń
District of Grätz (German: Kreis Grätz)	Grodzisk Wielkopolski
District of Jarotschin (German: Kreis Jarotschin)	Jarocin
District of Kempen (German: Kreis Kempen)	Kępno
District of Koschmin (German: Kreis Koschmin)	Koźmin Wielkopolski
District of Kosten (German: Kreis Kosten)	Kościan
District of Krotoschin (German: Kreis Krotoschin)	Krotoszyn
District of Lissa (German: Kreis Lissa)	Leszno
District of Meseritz (German: Kreis Meseritz) (partially: the eastern part of the district of Meseritz was transferred to Poland (320 km^{2}), including the town of Bentschen (now Zbąszyń), and was incorporated into the Nowy Tomyśl County. The remaining part of the district of Meseritz, including the town of Meseritz, became part of the new Prussian province of Posen–West Prussia)	Meseritz (at that time remained in Germany, now Polish Międzyrzecz)
District of Neutomischel (German: Kreis Neutomischel)	Nowy Tomyśl
District of Obornik (German: Kreis Obornik)	Oborniki
District of Ostrowo (German: Kreis Ostrowo)	Ostrów Wielkopolski
District of Pleschen (German: Kreis Pleschen)	Pleszew
District of Rawitsch (German: Kreis Rawitsch)	Rawicz
District of Samter (German: Kreis Samter)	Szamotuły
District of Schildberg (German: Kreis Schildberg)	Ostrzeszów
District of Schmiegel (German: Kreis Schmiegel)	Śmigiel
District of Schrimm (German: Kreis Schrimm)	Śrem
District of Schroda (German: Kreis Schroda)	Środa Wielkopolska
District of Wreschen (German: Kreis Wreschen)	Września

Part of the Posen region, the district of Schwerin an der Warthe (German: Kreis Schwerin an der Warthe) (capital of the district — Schwerin an der Warthe, now Skwierzyna) remained entirely within Germany after the First World War as part of the Prussian province of Posen–West Prussia, although it was later transferred to Poland.

===== Regierungsbezirk Bromberg =====
From the Regierungsbezirk of Bromberg, the following territories were transferred to Poland:

District (Kreis)	Capital
Urban district of Bromberg (German: Stadtkreis Bromberg) and surrounding area (German: Landkreis Bromberg)	Bydgoszcz
District of Czarnikau (German: Kreis Czarnikau) (partially: the territory south of the Noteć River was incorporated into Poland as Czarnków County, while the territory north of the Noteć River remained within the German Empire and became part of the Netze administrative region in the province of Posen–West Prussia)	Czarnków
District of Filehne (German: Kreis Filehne) (partially: the territory south of the Noteć River was incorporated into Poland as Wieleń County, while the territory north of the Noteć River remained within the German Empire and became part of the Netze administrative region in the province of Posen–West Prussia)	Wieleń
District of Gnesen (German: Kreis Gnesen)	Gniezno
District of Hohensalza (German: Kreis Hohensalza), formerly known as the district of Inowrazlaw (German: Kreis Inowrazlaw)	Inowrocław
District of Kolmar in Posen (German: Kreis Kolmar i. Posen) (partially: three-quarters of the district (898 km^{2}), including Kolmar, the district capital, were transferred to newly created Poland, where the territory became Chodzież County, while several communes of the district and the urban district of Schneidemühl (now Polish Piła) remained within the German Empire and became part of the province of Posen–West Prussia)	Chodzież
District of Mogilno (German: Kreis Mogilno)	Mogilno
District of Schubin (German: Kreis Schubin)	Szubin
District of Strelno (German: Kreis Strelno)	Strzelno
District of Wirsitz (German: Kreis Wirsitz)	Wyrzysk
District of Witkowo (German: Kreis Witkowo)	Witkowo
District of Wongrowitz (German: Kreis Wongrowitz)	Wągrowiec
District of Znin (German: Kreis Znin)	Żnin

Province of West Prussia before the First World War

==== West Prussia ====
Division of the province's territory between Poland (red), the Free City of Danzig (yellow), and the Weimar Republic (blue). Pink areas indicate territories incorporated into East Prussia following the plebiscite

West Prussia was partially lost by Germany after the First World War. Most of its districts were transferred to the newly established Poland, while from the northern districts of the province the Free City of Danzig was formed. The fate of part of the districts was decided by the East Prussian plebiscite — these districts, populated predominantly by Polish-speaking inhabitants, were placed under the control of the Entente. As a result of the plebiscite held there on 11 July 1920, this territory remained within Germany and was subsequently incorporated into the province of East Prussia (part of the territory was also transferred to Poland as a result of the plebiscite). After the Second World War, Germany lost all territories that had belonged to this province.

===== Transferred to Poland =====
District (Kreis)	Capital	Former administrative region (Regierungsbezirk)
District of Putzig (German: Kreis Putzig), became part of the newly established Pomeranian County	Puck	Danzig
District of Neustadt in West Prussia (German: Kreis Neustadt i. Westpr.), became part of the newly established Pomeranian County	Wejherowo	Danzig
District of Karthaus (German: Kreis Karthaus)	Kartuzy	Danzig
District of Berent (German: Kreis Berent)	Kościerzyna	Danzig
District of Dirschau (German: Kreis Dirschau)	Tczew	Danzig
District of Preußisch Stargard (German: Kreis Preußisch Stargard)	Starogard Gdański	Danzig
District of Konitz (German: Kreis Konitz)	Chojnice	Marienwerder
District of Tuchel (German: Kreis Tuchel)	Tuchola	Marienwerder
District of Schwetz (German: Kreis Schwetz)	Świecie	Marienwerder
Urban district of Graudenz (German: Stadtkreis Graudenz) and surrounding area (German: Kreis Graudenz-Land)	Grudziądz	Marienwerder
District of Löbau (German: Kreis Löbau)	Nowe Miasto Lubawskie	Marienwerder
District of Strasburg in West Prussia (German: Kreis Strasburg i. Westpr.)	Brodnica	Marienwerder
District of Culm (German: Kreis Culm)	Chełmno	Marienwerder
District of Briesen (German: Kreis Briesen)	Wąbrzeźno	Marienwerder
Urban district of Thorn (German: Stadtkreis Thorn) and surrounding area (German: Kreis Thorn-Land)	Toruń	Marienwerder
District of Flatow (German: Kreis Flatow, Ostteil) (partially: only the eastern part, including the towns of Vandsburg (Więcbork), Zempelburg (Sępólno Krajeńskie), and Kamin in West Prussia (Kamień Krajeński), formed the Sępólno County in Poland, while the remaining part of the district in Germany was subordinated to the province of Posen–West Prussia with its capital in Schneidemühl)	Flatow (at that time remained in Germany, now Złotów)	Marienwerder

===== Transferred to the Free City of Danzig =====
District (Kreis)	Capital	Former administrative region (Regierungsbezirk)
Urban district of Danzig (German: Stadtkreis Danzig)	Gdańsk	Danzig
District of Danziger Höhe (German: Kreis Danziger Höhe) (was expanded by incorporating parts of the districts of Karthaus, Berent, and Dirschau, but ceded a small northwestern area to the Polish Kartuzy County)	Gdańsk	Danzig
District of Danziger Niederung (German: Kreis Danziger Niederung) (expanded by incorporating part of the district of Dirschau)	Gdańsk	Danzig
Rural district of Großes Werder (German: Landkreis Großes Werder) (a new district formed from most of the district of Marienburg, as well as the part of the district of Elbing located west of the Nogat River)	Tiegenhof, now Nowy Dwór Gdański	Danzig (both Marienburg in West Prussia and Elbing were part of the Regierungsbezirk Danzig)
Urban district of Zoppot (German: Stadtkreis Zoppot) (separated from the district of Neustadt in West Prussia and established as an independent city)	Sopot	Danzig

===== Territories of West Prussia remaining in Germany until the end of the Second World War =====
District (Kreis)	Capital	Former administrative region (Regierungsbezirk)
District of Deutsch Krone (German: Kreis Deutsch Krone) (part of the province of Posen–West Prussia)	Deutsch Krone (now Wałcz)	Marienwerder
District of Schlochau (German: Kreis Schlochau) (part of the province of Posen–West Prussia)	Schlochau (now Człuchów)	Marienwerder
District of Flatow (German: Kreis Flatow) (part of the province of Posen–West Prussia, reduced in size after the eastern part of the district was transferred to Poland)	Flatow (now Złotów)	Marienwerder
Urban district of Elbing (German: Stadtkreis Elbing) (incorporated into the province of East Prussia) and surrounding area (German: Kreis Elbing-Land) (also incorporated into East Prussia, although the western part of the district (west of the Nogat River) was transferred to the Free City of Danzig)	Elbing (now Elbląg)	Danzig

According to the Treaty of Versailles, the following territories were designated as a plebiscite area and placed under the control of the Entente. After the East Prussian plebiscite held on 11 July 1920, this territory remained within Germany and was subsequently incorporated as the West Prussian administrative district into the province of East Prussia, where it remained until the end of the Second World War, after which it was transferred to Poland.

The Soldau (Działdowo) region, transferred to Poland, marked in red

District (Kreis)	Capital	Former administrative region (Regierungsbezirk)
District of Marienwerder (eastern part) (German: Kreis Marienwerder, Ostteil) (the western part of the district was transferred to Poland and became the Gniew county, later incorporated into Tczew County)	Marienwerder (now Kwidzyn)	Marienwerder
District of Stuhm (German: Kreis Stuhm)	Sztum	Marienwerder
District of Rosenberg in West Prussia (German: Kreis Rosenberg i. Westpr.)	Rosenberg (now Susz)	Marienwerder
District of Marienburg in West Prussia (eastern part) (German: Kreis Marienburg i. Westpr., Ostteil) (the part of the district located east of the Nogat River remained in Germany; the western part became part of the Großes Werder rural district of the Free City of Danzig)	Marienburg (now Malbork)	Danzig

In the German-speaking parts of Posen and West Prussia, the German National Council for West Prussia and Posen (German: Deutscher Volksrat für Westpreußen und Posen) was established, on whose initiative the province of Posen–West Prussia was created.

In addition, in accordance with the provisions of the Treaty of Versailles, the town of Soldau (now Działdowo) together with 32 other municipalities of the district of Neidenburg in the province of East Prussia (the so-called Soldau region) was transferred to Poland, as a strategic railway line from Danzig to Warsaw passed through the territory. (Note: Article 94)

Territory of the province of Silesia before the First World War. Green — Regierungsbezirk Liegnitz, yellow — Regierungsbezirk Breslau, purple — Regierungsbezirk Oppeln

==== Silesia ====
The Prussian province of Silesia was also lost by Germany in several stages.

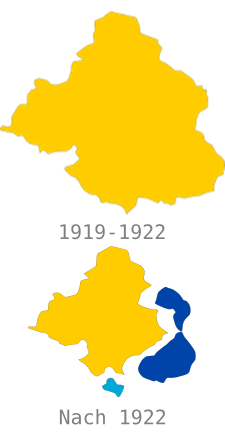
Top — territory of Upper Silesia (former Regierungsbezirk Oppeln); bottom — blue indicates territories transferred to Poland (becoming the Autonomous Silesian Voivodeship), light blue marks the Hlučín Region transferred to Czechoslovakia

In the German Empire before the First World War, Silesia was administratively divided into three administrative regions (German: Regierungsbezirk) — the Regierungsbezirke of Liegnitz, Breslau, and Oppeln. After the First World War, the Treaty of Versailles provided that parts of the border between newly established Poland and Germany were to be determined by a plebiscite. In preparation for the Upper Silesian plebiscite, on 14 October 1919 the Prussian National Assembly passed a law establishing the province of Upper Silesia, which came into force on 8 November 1919. The new province was formed from the former administrative district of Oppeln. Accordingly, the administrative districts of Liegnitz and Breslau formed the new province of Lower Silesia.

Between 1919 and 1921, violent clashes (three Silesian uprisings) occurred between the Polish population, demanding annexation to Poland, and German police units and Freikorps. On voting day, 20 March 1921, 707,554 inhabitants of Upper Silesia (59.6%) voted to remain in Germany (with a turnout of 97.8%), while 478,820 (40.4%) voted for Poland.

In May 1921, the third uprising aimed at the full incorporation of Upper Silesia into Poland was defeated. Subsequently, part of Upper Silesia (29% of its territory, later referred to in Germany as "East Upper Silesia") was transferred to Poland by a decision of the League of Nations on 10 October 1921. East Upper Silesia, transferred to Poland and becoming the Autonomous Silesian Voivodeship, included most of the Upper Silesian industrial region with half of all steelworks, significant coal and iron ore deposits, and economically important mining areas. The partition took effect on 15 July 1922. Just over two-thirds of the territory remained in Germany. The cities and industrial centres of Königshütte (Chorzów), Kattowitz (Katowice), Myslowitz (Mysłowice), Laurahütte (Siemianowice Śląskie), Bismarckhütte (Chorzów-Batory, part of Chorzów), Schwientochlowitz (Świętochłowice), Lipine (Lipiny), and Ruda (Ruda Śląska) became Polish. The Hlučín Region (German: Hultschiner Ländchen) became part of Czechoslovakia. (Note: Articles 81 and 83)

As a result of the First World War, Germany lost the following districts (in whole or in part) to Poland and Czechoslovakia:

District (Kreis)	Capital
Urban district of Kattowitz (German: Stadtkreis Kattowitz) and surrounding area (rural district of Kattowitz, German: Landkreis Kattowitz)	Katowice
Urban district of Königshütte (German: Stadtkreis Königshütte)	Chorzów (1922–1939: Królewska Huta)
Rural district of Beuthen (German: Landkreis Beuthen) (the eastern part of the district was incorporated into Poland, forming the Świętochłowice County within the Silesian Voivodeship. The remaining part of the district, including the city of Beuthen (now Polish Bytom), became a border town with Poland)	
District of Zabrze / Hindenburg (German: Kreis Zabrze / Hindenburg O.S.) (Poland received the municipalities and estates of Biskupitz, Bujakow, Chudow, Groß-Paniow, Klein-Paniow, Kunzendorf, Makoschau, Paulsdorf, and Ruda (now Ruda Śląska). The city of Hindenburg (now Zabrze), as well as Biskupitz, Mathesdorf, Sosnitza, and Saborsche, remained in Germany)	
District of Lublinitz (German: Kreis Lublinitz) (the eastern two-thirds of the district, including the towns of Lublinitz and Woźniki (now Woźniki), were transferred to Poland)	Lubliniec
District of Pleß (German: Kreis Pleß)	Pszczyna
Rural district of Ratibor (German: Landkreis Ratibor) (the southeastern part of the district, including 21 villages and 19 estate districts, was transferred to Poland. Poland received, among others, the villages of Lubomia, Syrinia, and Gorzyce, covering a total area of 127.36 km^{2} with a population of 16,022)	
District of Rybnik (German: Kreis Rybnik) (most of the district was transferred to Poland; the remaining small part in Germany was divided between the rural districts of Ratibor and Tost-Gleiwitz)	Rybnik
District of Tarnowitz (German: Kreis Tarnowitz) (most of the district was transferred to Poland in 1922, becoming the Tarnowskie Góry County. The remaining German part, including several municipalities and estates, was later merged in 1927 with part of the district of Beuthen to form the district of Beuthen-Tarnowitz, administered from Beuthen)	Tarnowskie Góry
District of Tost-Gleiwitz (German: Kreis Tost-Gleiwitz) (only three municipalities — Geraltowitz (Gierałtowice), Mikoleska, and Preiswitz (Przyszowice) — were transferred to Poland)	

A part of the rural district of Ratibor (German: Landkreis Ratibor), namely the Hlučín Region and the area around the villages of Píšť and Hať (30.47 km^{2} with a population of 3,286), was transferred to Czechoslovakia.

East Prussia before the First World War. Green — Regierungsbezirk Königsberg, blue — Regierungsbezirk Gumbinnen, red — Regierungsbezirk Allenstein

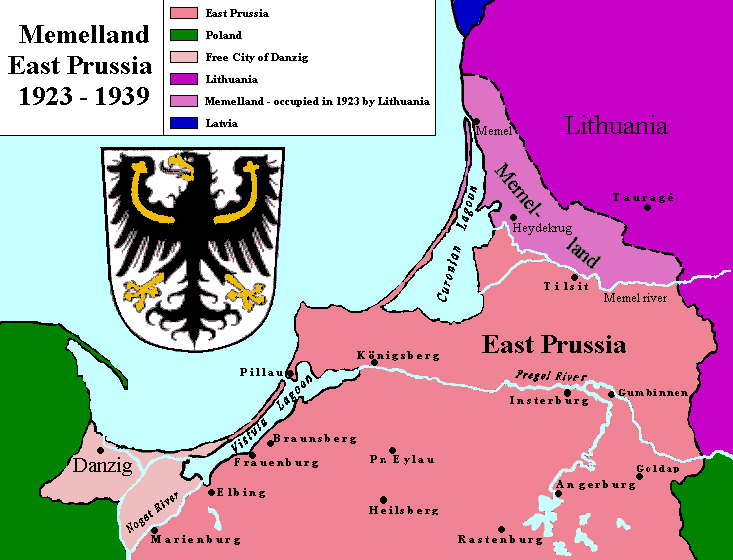
Memel Territory marked in pink

==== Memel Territory ====
The Memel Territory was placed under the administration of the League of Nations and was later transferred to Lithuania in 1923. Parts of the following districts were lost in favour of independent Lithuania:

District (Kreis)	Capital	Administrative region (Regierungsbezirk)
City of Memel (German: Memel-Stadt) and surrounding area (German: Memel-Land, Landkreis Memel)	Klaipėda	Königsberg
District of Heydekrug (German: Kreis Heydekrug) (most of the district; the southern part remained in Germany, where it is now part of the Slavsk District of Kaliningrad Oblast)	Šilutė	Gumbinnen
District of Niederung (Heinrichswalde) (German: Kreis Niederung/Heinrichswalde) (partially)	Heinrichswalde (at that time remained in Germany, now Slavsk)	Gumbinnen
District of Tilsit (German: Kreis Tilsit) (partially)	Tilsit (at that time remained in Germany, now Sovetsk)	Gumbinnen
District of Ragnit (German: Kreis Ragnit) (partially) (the remaining parts of the three above-mentioned districts were merged into the newly formed district of Pogegen (German: Landkreis Pogegen), with its capital in Pogegen (now Pagėgiai), becoming an administrative unit of the Memel Territory)	Ragnit (at that time remained in Germany, now Neman)	Gumbinnen

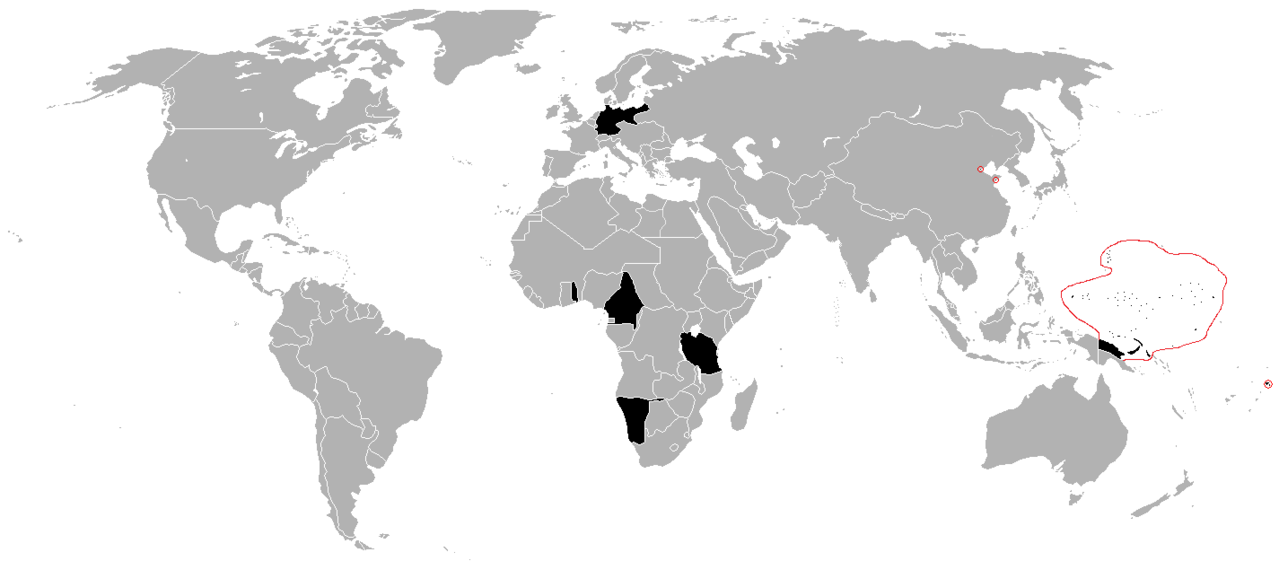
German colonial empire lost as a result of the First World War

=== World ===
As a result of the First World War, Germany lost its colonies in Africa, as well as in Asia and Oceania.

==== Africa ====
1. German East Africa (from 1891). In 1919 it was divided into:
  - Ruanda-Urundi, placed under the mandate of Belgium, which became the independent states of Burundi and Rwanda in 1962;
  - Tanganyika, placed under the mandate of the United Kingdom, gained independence in 1964 and became part of Tanzania;
2. German South West Africa (from 1884). From 1919 it became a mandate of the South African Union, now Namibia;
3. German Cameroon (from 1884). In 1919 it was divided — part became a mandate of France (now Cameroon), and part became a mandate of the United Kingdom (now part of Nigeria);
4. German Togoland (from 1884). In August 1914, the German colonial administration abandoned the territory, after which it was divided between France (now Togo) and the United Kingdom (since 1956 part of Ghana).

==== Asia and Oceania ====
1. German New Guinea (1885–1919, later a mandate of Australia, now part of Papua New Guinea)
  - Kaiser-Wilhelmsland (mainland part of New Guinea)
  - Bismarck Archipelago (from 1919 an Australian mandate, now part of Papua New Guinea)
  - Bougainville Island and other northern Solomon Islands (from 1919 an Australian mandate, now part of Papua New Guinea)
  - Nauru — 1888–1919, later a joint mandate of Australia, the United Kingdom, and New Zealand
2. Caroline Islands — 1889–1919, later a mandate of Japan
  - Palau — 1899–1919, later a mandate of Japan
3. Mariana Islands — 1889–1919, later a mandate of Japan
4. Marshall Islands — 1885–1919, later a mandate of Japan
5. German Samoa (from 1919 a mandate of New Zealand, now Samoa)
6. Concessions in China:
  - Qingdao (also known as Jiaozhou, Kiaochow, etc., 1897–1914, now part of the People's Republic of China)
    - sphere of influence in Shandong Province (Yantai etc.)
  - in Tianjin (1899–1917)

== After the Second World War ==
Territorial losses of Germany after the Second World War

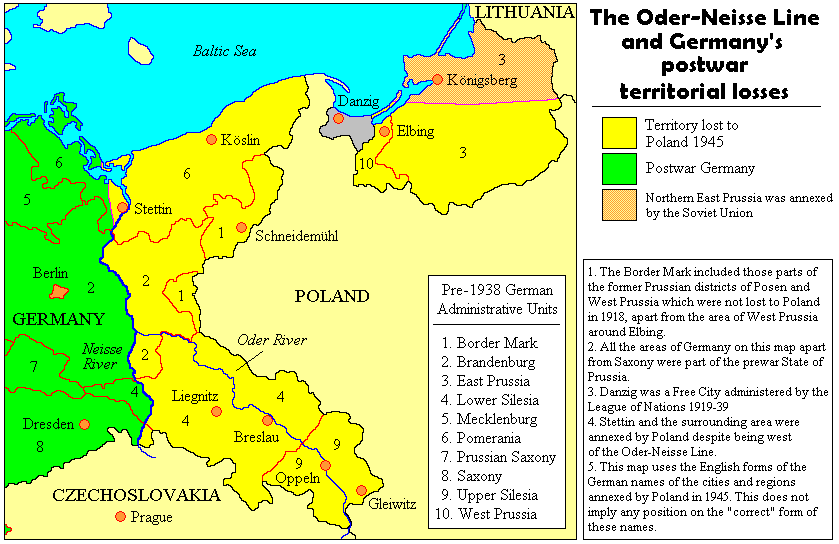
Changes in the administrative-territorial division of Germany after the Second World War

As a result of the Second World War, Germany also underwent territorial changes. Territories east of the Oder–Neisse line were lost; these areas had been administratively part of the largest component of the Weimar Republic and the Third Reich — the Free State of Prussia — as well as a small part of the state of Saxony (the town of Reichenau with its surroundings, now Bogatynia in Poland).

In addition, Germany briefly lost the Saar region (until 1957), which was later returned to the Federal Republic of Germany as its tenth federal state.

Former parts of the Free State of Prussia:

=== East Prussia ===
East Prussia was permanently lost after the Second World War in favour of the USSR and Poland (today the territory of former East Prussia is divided between Lithuania, Poland, and Russia). Districts of the Regierungsbezirk Königsberg transferred to the USSR and Poland:

Regierungsbezirk Königsberg
1937	District capital (modern name)	1945
Königsberg (German: Stadtkreis Königsberg (Pr)) and surrounding area (German: Landkreis Königsberg (Pr))	Kaliningrad	Königsberg (German: Stadtkreis Königsberg (Pr))
Bartenstein (German: Landkreis Bartenstein)	Bartoszyce	Bartenstein (East Prussia) (German: Landkreis Bartenstein (Ostpr.))
Braunsberg (German: Kreis Braunsberg)	Braniewo	Braunsberg (East Prussia) (German: Kreis Braunsberg (Ostpr.))
Fischhausen (German: Landkreis Samland — Fischhausen)	Primorsk	Samland (German: Landkreis Samland, capital: Königsberg)
Gerdauen (German: Kreis Gerdauen)	Zheleznodorozhny	Gerdauen (German: Kreis Gerdauen)
Heiligenbeil (German: Kreis Heiligenbeil)	Mamonovo	Heiligenbeil (German: Kreis Heiligenbeil)
Heilsberg (German: Kreis Heilsberg)	Lidzbark Warmiński	Heilsberg (German: Kreis Heilsberg)
Labiau (German: Kreis Labiau)	Polessk	Labiau (German: Kreis Labiau)
Mohrungen (German: Kreis Mohrungen)	Morąg	Mohrungen (German: Kreis Mohrungen)
Preußisch Eylau (German: Kreis Preußisch Eylau)	Bagrationovsk	Preußisch Eylau (German: Kreis Preußisch Eylau)
Preußisch Holland (German: Kreis Preußisch Holland)	Pasłęk	Preußisch Holland (German: Kreis Preußisch Holland)
Rastenburg (German: Kreis Rastenburg)	Kętrzyn	Rastenburg (German: Kreis Rastenburg)
Wehlau (German: Kreis Wehlau)	Znamensk	Wehlau (German: Kreis Wehlau)

Districts of the Regierungsbezirk Allenstein transferred to Poland:

Regierungsbezirk Allenstein
District name	District capital (modern name)
Urban district of Allenstein (German: Stadtkreis Allenstein) and surrounding area (German: Landkreis Allenstein)	Olsztyn
District of Johannisburg (German: Kreis Johannisburg)	Pisz
District of Lötzen (German: Kreis Lötzen)	Giżycko
District of Lyck (German: Kreis Lyck)	Ełk
District of Neidenburg (German: Kreis Neidenburg)	Nidzica
District of Ortelsburg (German: Kreis Ortelsburg)	Szczytno
District of Osterode in East Prussia (German: Kreis Osterode in Ostpreußen)	Ostróda
District of Rößel (German: Kreis Rößel)	Reszel, later from 1862 Biskupiec
District of Sensburg (German: Kreis Sensburg)	Mrągowo

Districts of the Regierungsbezirk Gumbinnen transferred to the USSR and Poland (some districts were renamed by 1945 as part of Germanisation of Baltic-origin toponyms):

Regierungsbezirk Gumbinnen
1937	District capital (modern name)	1945
Insterburg (German: Stadtkreis Insterburg) and surrounding area (German: Kreis Insterburg)	Chernyakhovsk	
Angerburg (German: Kreis Angerburg)	Węgorzewo	
Darkehmen (German: Landkreis Darkehmen)	Ozyorsk	Angerapp (German: Landkreis Angerapp)
Goldap (German: Kreis Goldap)	Gołdap	
Gumbinnen (German: Kreis Gumbinnen)	Gusev	
Niederung (German: Landkreis Niederung)	Slavsk	Elchniederung (German: Landkreis Elchniederung)
Pillkallen (German: Landkreis Schloßberg (Ostpr.) — Pillkallen)	Dobrovolsk (the administrative centre of the modern Krasnoznamensky District, located on the territory of the former district, is Krasnoznamensk, formerly Lasdehnen)	Schloßberg in East Prussia (German: Landkreis Schloßberg (Ostpr.))
Stallupönen (German: Landkreis Ebenrode — Stallupönen)	Nesterov	Ebenrode (German: Landkreis Ebenrode)
Tilsit-Ragnit (German: Landkreis Tilsit-Ragnit, capital: Tilsit)	Sovetsk (Ragnit — now the town of Neman)	
Treuburg (German: Kreis Oletzko — Treuburg)	Olecko	Treuburg (German: Kreis Oletzko — Treuburg)

The administrative district of West Prussia was formed as a result of the First World War (it consisted of a part of the former Prussian province of West Prussia that remained within Germany following the plebiscite). After the beginning of the Second World War, the district was abolished and incorporated into the newly created Reichsgau Danzig–West Prussia. Following the Second World War, the territory of the district was transferred to Poland.

Regierungsbezirk West Prussia
1937	District capital
Elbing (German: Stadtkreis Elbing) and surrounding area (German: Landkreis Elbing)	Elbląg
Marienburg in West Prussia (German: Landkreis Marienburg (Westpr.))	Malbork
Marienwerder (German: Landkreis Marienwerder)	Kwidzyn
Rosenberg in West Prussia (German: Kreis Rosenberg i. Westpr.)	Susz
Stuhm (German: Landkreis Stuhm)	Sztum

=== Posen–West Prussia ===
The province of Posen–West Prussia, formed after the First World War from the remaining German parts of the province of Posen, was transferred to Poland as a result of the Second World War. The table lists the districts as of 1938, without accounting for wartime administrative changes.

District name	District capital
Urban district of Schneidemühl (German: Stadtkreis Schneidemühl)	Piła
District of Bomst (German: Landkreis Bomst)	Babimost
District of Deutsch Krone (German: Landkreis Deutsch Krone)	Wałcz
District of Flatow (German: Landkreis Flatow)	Złotów
District of Fraustadt (German: Landkreis Fraustadt)	Wschowa
District of Meseritz (German: Landkreis Meseritz)	Międzyrzecz
District of Netze (German: Netzekreis) (formed from the districts of Czarnikau, Filehne, and Kolmar in Posen, with its administrative centre in Schönlanke, now Trzcianka)	Trzcianka
District of Schlochau (German: Landkreis Schlochau)	Człuchów
District of Schwerin an der Warthe (German: Landkreis Schwerin (Warthe))	Skwierzyna

=== Upper Silesia ===
Upper Silesia (province) was completely lost to Poland. The following districts are listed as of 1938, without accounting for wartime administrative changes.

Stadtkreise and Landkreise
District	District capital (modern name)
City of Beuthen (German: Beuthen) and surrounding area (German: Landkreis Beuthen) (remaining German-controlled part)	Bytom
District of Cosel (German: Kreis Cosel)	part of the city Kędzierzyn-Koźle
District of Falkenberg (German: Kreis Falkenberg)	Niemodlin
District of Groß Strehlitz (German: Kreis Groß Strehlitz)	Strzelce Opolskie
District of Grottkau (German: Kreis Grottkau)	Grodków
District of Zabrze (German: Kreis Zabrze, from 1915 Hindenburg O.S.) (remaining German-controlled part)	Zabrze
District of Kreuzburg (German: Kreis Kreuzburg)	Kluczbork
District of Leobschütz (German: Kreis Leobschütz)	Głubczyce
City of Neisse (German: Neisse) and surrounding area (German: Landkreis Neisse)	Nysa
District of Neustadt in Upper Silesia (German: Kreis Neustadt O.S.)	Prudnik
City of Oppeln (German: Oppeln) and surrounding area (German: Landkreis Oppeln)	Opole
City of Ratibor (German: Ratibor) and surrounding area (German: Landkreis Ratibor) (remaining German-controlled part)	Racibórz
District of Rosenberg (German: Kreis Rosenberg)	Olesno
District of Rybnik (German: Kreis Rybnik) (remaining German-controlled part, divided between the districts of Ratibor and Tost-Gleiwitz)	
District of Tarnowitz (German: Kreis Tarnowitz) (remaining German-controlled part, incorporated into the district of Beuthen-Tarnowitz)	
City of Gleiwitz (German: Gleiwitz) and surrounding area (district of Tost-Gleiwitz (German: Kreis Tost-Gleiwitz)) (remaining German-controlled part)	Gliwice

=== Lower Silesia (partially) ===
Most of Lower Silesia (province) was lost to Poland, while a small western part remained in Germany.

==== Former administrative district of Breslau ====
Stadtkreise and Kreise (urban and rural districts)
District	District capital (modern name)
Breslau (German: Breslau) and surrounding area (German: Landkreis Breslau)	Wrocław
City of Brieg (German: Brieg, from 1907) and surrounding area (German: Landkreis Brieg)	Brzeg
District of Frankenstein (German: Kreis Frankenstein)	Ząbkowice Śląskie
District of Glatz (German: Kreis Glatz)	Kłodzko
District of Groß Wartenberg (German: Kreis Groß Wartenberg)	Syców
District of Guhrau (German: Kreis Guhrau)	Góra
District of Habelschwerdt (German: Kreis Habelschwerdt)	Bystrzyca Kłodzka
District of Militsch (German: Kreis Militsch)	Milicz
District of Münsterberg (German: Kreis Münsterberg)	Ziębice
District of Namslau (German: Kreis Namslau)	Namysłów
District of Neumarkt (German: Kreis Neumarkt)	Środa Śląska
District of Neurode (German: Kreis Neurode)	Nowa Ruda
District of Nimptsch (German: Kreis Nimptsch)	Niemcza
District of Oels (German: Kreis Oels)	Oleśnica
District of Ohlau (German: Kreis Ohlau)	Oława
District of Reichenbach (German: Kreis Reichenbach)	Dzierżoniów
City of Schweidnitz (German: Schweidnitz) and surrounding area (German: Landkreis Schweidnitz)	Świdnica
District of Steinau (German: Kreis Steinau)	Ścinawa
District of Strehlen (German: Kreis Strehlen)	Strzelin
District of Striegau (German: Kreis Striegau)	Strzegom
District of Trebnitz (German: Kreis Trebnitz)	Trzebnica
District of Waldenburg (German: Kreis Waldenburg)	Wałbrzych
District of Wohlau (German: Kreis Wohlau)	Wołów

==== Former administrative district of Liegnitz ====
Stadtkreise and Kreise (urban and rural districts)
District	District capital
District of Bolkenhain (German: Kreis Bolkenhain), incorporated into the district of Landeshut in 1932	Bolków
District of Bunzlau (German: Kreis Bunzlau)	Bolesławiec
District of Freystadt (German: Kreis Freystadt)	Kożuchów
City of Glogau (German: Glogau) and surrounding area (German: Kreis Glogau)	Głogów
District of Goldberg-Haynau (German: Kreis Goldberg-Haynau)	Złotoryja, Chojnów
City of Görlitz (German: Görlitz) and surrounding area (German: Landkreis Görlitz)	divided by the border into Görlitz (Germany) and Zgorzelec (Poland)
District of Grünberg (German: Kreis Grünberg)	Zielona Góra
District of Hirschberg in the Riesengebirge (German: Kreis Hirschberg i. R.)	Jelenia Góra
District of Jauer (German: Kreis Jauer)	Jawor
District of Landeshut (German: Kreis Landeshut)	Kamienna Góra
District of Lauban (German: Kreis Lauban)	Lubań
City of Liegnitz (German: Liegnitz) and surrounding area (German: Landkreis Liegnitz)	Legnica
District of Löwenberg (German: Kreis Löwenberg)	Lwówek Śląski
District of Lüben (German: Kreis Lüben)	Lubin
District of Rothenburg (Upper Lusatia) (German: Kreis Rothenburg (Ob. Laus.)) (partially: settlements east of the Neisse River became part of Poland, while the town of Rothenburg remained in Germany)	
District of Sagan (German: Kreis Sagan) (partially: most of the district became part of Poland, while the western part west of the Neisse near the village of Pechern remained in Germany)	Żagań
District of Schönau (German: Kreis Schönau)	Świerzawa
District of Sprottau (German: Kreis Sprottau)	Szprotawa

The district of Hoyerswerda, also part of the Regierungsbezirk Liegnitz, remained entirely within Germany.

=== Pomerania (partially) ===
Most of Province of Pomerania was lost to Poland, while a small western part remained in Germany.

==== Former administrative district of Köslin ====
District	District capital
District of Belgard (German: Kreis Belgard)	Białogard
District of Bublitz (German: Kreis Bublitz)	Bobolice
District of Bütow (German: Kreis Bütow)	Bytów
District of Dramburg (German: Kreis Dramburg)	Drawsko Pomorskie
District of Greifenberg in Pomerania (German: Kreis Greifenberg i. Pom.)	Gryfice
City of Kolberg (German: Kolberg, Stadt) and district of Kolberg-Körlin (German: Kreis Kolberg-Körlin)	Kołobrzeg, Karlino
City of Köslin (German: Köslin, Stadt) and surrounding area (German: Kreis Köslin)	Koszalin
District of Lauenburg in Pomerania (German: Kreis Lauenburg i. Pom.)	Lębork
District of Neustettin (German: Kreis Neustettin)	Szczecinek
District of Regenwalde (German: Kreis Regenwalde)	Resko
District of Rummelsburg (German: Kreis Rummelsburg)	Miastko
District of Schivelbein (German: Kreis Schivelbein)	Świdwin
District of Schlawe (German: Kreis Schlawe)	Sławno
City of Stolp (German: Stolp, Stadt) and surrounding area (German: Kreis Stolp)	Słupsk

==== Former administrative district of Stettin ====
District	District capital
Stettin (German: Stettin, Stadt)	Szczecin
Stargard in Pomerania (German: Stargard in Pommern, Stadt) and surrounding area — district of Saatzig (German: Kreis Saatzig)	Stargard
District of Cammin (German: Kreis Cammin)	Kamień Pomorski
District of Greifenhagen (German: Kreis Greifenhagen) (partially: the district was divided between Poland and Germany; the district capital, Gryfino, was transferred to Poland)	Gryfino
District of Naugard (German: Kreis Naugard)	Nowogard
District of Pyritz (German: Kreis Pyritz)	Pyrzyce
District of Randow (German: Kreis Randow) (partially: eastern part transferred to Poland)	
District of Regenwalde (German: Kreis Regenwalde)	Łobez
District of Ueckermünde (German: Kreis Ueckermünde) (the district capital, Ueckermünde, remained in Germany; towns of Neuwarp (Nowe Warpno) and Ziegenort (Trzebież) were transferred to Poland)	
District of Usedom-Wollin (German: Kreis Usedom-Wollin) (western part remained in Germany; Poland received the island of Wolin and the eastern part of Usedom with the district capital Świnoujście)	Świnoujście

=== Brandenburg (partially) ===
The Prussian province of Province of Brandenburg (before the war consisting of the Regierungsbezirke Potsdam and Frankfurt). From the Regierungsbezirk Potsdam, Poland received a narrow strip of land belonging to the district of Angermünde. The remaining Brandenburg territories transferred to Poland were part of the Regierungsbezirk Frankfurt.

Urban and rural districts	District capital
City of Guben (a divided town between Poland and Germany) and surrounding area — District of Guben (German: Kreis Guben) (partially, divided along the Neisse River)	Gubin
City of Landsberg an der Warthe (German: Landsberg (Warthe)) and surrounding area (German: Kreis Landsberg (Warthe))	Gorzów Wielkopolski
District of Arnswalde (German: Kreis Arnswalde)	Choszczno
District of Crossen (German: Kreis Crossen)	Krosno Odrzańskie
District of Friedeberg (Neumark) (German: Kreis Friedeberg Nm., until 1938)	Strzelce Krajeńskie
District of Königsberg in der Neumark (German: Kreis Königsberg Nm.)	Chojna
District of Lebus (German: Kreis Lebus) (only the eastern part of the district, including the towns of Kostrzyn nad Odrą and Słubice)	
District of Oststernberg (German: Kreis Oststernberg, from 1873)	Sulęcin, Ośno Lubuskie
District of Soldin (German: Kreis Soldin)	Myślibórz
District of Sorau (German: Kreis Sorau) (only the eastern part, including the district capital, the town of Żary, was transferred to Poland)	Żary
District of Weststernberg (German: Kreis Weststernberg) (almost entirely transferred to Poland, except for small areas west of the Oder)	Rzepin
District of Züllichau-Schwiebus (German: Kreis Züllichau-Schwiebus)	Sulechów, Świebodzin

Former parts of Saxony: a section of the Saxon district of Zittau east of the Oder–Neisse line was transferred to Poland (now the town of Bogatynia and several surrounding villages) (142 km^{2}).

All territories lost by Germany in Europe in the 20th century
