= The Yearling (disambiguation) =

The Yearling is a 1938 novel by Marjorie Kinnan Rawlings.

The Yearling may also refer to:

- The Yearling (1946 film)
- The Yearling (1994 film)
- The Yearling (TV series), a 1983 adaptation
- The Yearling (sculpture), a 1993 work by Donald Lipski

== See also ==
- Yearling (disambiguation)
