= Canfield =

Canfield may refer to:

== Card games ==
- Canfield (solitaire), known in Britain as the patience game, Demon
- Klondike (solitaire) known in Britain as the patience game, Canfield

== Places ==
=== United States ===
- Canfield, Arkansas
- Canfield, Colorado
- former name of Edison Park, Chicago, Illinois, a community area
- Canfield, Ohio, a city
- Canfield, Braxton County, West Virginia, an unincorporated community
- Canfield, Randolph County, West Virginia, an unincorporated community
- Canfield Creek, a stream in Minnesota

=== Elsewhere ===
- Canfield, Ontario, Canada
- Canfield Mesa, Victoria Land, Antarctica
- Great Canfield and Little Canfield, Essex, England

== People ==
- Canfield (surname)

== Other uses ==
- USS Canfield (DE-262), a World War II destroyer escort
- Canfield's, a producer and bottler of soda beverages, mainly in the Chicago area
- Canfield Speedway, Canfield, Ohio, an auto racing track
- Canfield Casino and Congress Park, Sarasota Springs, New York, a National Historic Landmark
- Canfield ocean, a geological theory
