= Cock o' the North (liqueur) =

Scottish whisky liqueur

- Type: Whisky Ligueur
- Manufacturer: The Speyside distillery (Granville Gordon)
- Origin: Scotland
- Alcohol by volume: 35%
- Ingredients: Distilled Whisky, Water, Blaeberry Juice
- Related products: Speyside 12 year old Whisky; Cú Dhub Whisky
- Website: cockothenorth.com

Cock o' the North is a whisky liqueur, owned by the Gordon Clan of Aboyne Castle, Aberdeenshire. It has been produced under contract at the Speyside Distillery facility at Kingussie, Speyside.

== History ==
Cock o' the North Liqueur is named for the Chief of the Gordon Clan who has been known for centuries as 'The Cock o' the North'. According to family legends, the Gordon's used to make a drink based on whisky and blaeberry (Scottish Blueberry) together with other special ingredients, to sustain them on long journeys, in battle and to welcome guests.

Cock o' the North was made from a single malt from Speyside in the smallest distillery in Scotland. Production ceased around 2015
