= Cock o' the North =

Cock o' the North may refer to:

== People ==
- Cock o' the North, the traditional epithet attached to the chief of the Clan Gordon
  - Alexander Gordon, 4th Duke of Gordon (1743–1827), known as Cock o' the North

== Transportation ==
- Cock o' the North, a LNER P2 class railway locomotive
  - Cock o' the North, a LNER Thompson Class A2/2 railway locomotive rebuilt from said P2

== Other uses ==
- Cock o' the North (liqueur), a whisky-based alcoholic liqueur
- Cock o' the North (greyhounds), a UK greyhound race
- Cock o' the North (golf), a golf tournament formerly held in Zambia
- Cock o' the North (music), a traditional Scottish bagpipe tune
- Cock o' the North (film), a 1935 British film
- Brambling (Fringilla montifringilla), a bird, also known as cock o' the north
