= Canfield Creek =

- Mouth of Canfield Creek

Location
- Country: United States
- State: Minnesota
- County: Fillmore

Physical characteristics
- Source
  - coordinates: 43.5666317°N 92.3287803°W
- Mouth
  - coordinates: 43.6221870°N 92.2240541°W

Basin features
- River system: South Branch Root River

Canfield Creek is a stream in Fillmore County, located in the U.S. state of Minnesota.

Canfield Creek was named for S. G. Canfield, an early settler.

== See also ==
- List of rivers of Minnesota
