= Lumber room =

Room to store unused items, usually furniture

A lumber room is a room, often in the attic of a house, used for storing unused possessions such as furniture and other items the household has been "lumbered with", or accumulated over time. The name derives from the older sense of "lumber," meaning miscellaneous, cumbersome, or unwanted objects that are difficult to dispose of. The Oxford English Dictionary found the first use of "lumber room" appeared in 1740 in Samuel Richardson's novel Pamela, "My own little Chapel, which has not been us'd..for any thing but a Lumber-room."

When used figuratively, the phrase can mean useless knowledge. For example, "Many great readers load their memories, without exercising their judgments; and make lumber-rooms of their heads instead of furnishing them usefully..."
