= Boob tube =

Boob tube can mean:

- Boob tube, US slang for a television set
- Boob tube, British term for a tube top
- The Boob Tube, a 1975 parody of soap operas/TV commercials, marketed to capitalize on the success of The Groove Tube and similar comedy films of the era
