= Speyside distillery =

Whisky distillery in Kingussie, Scotland

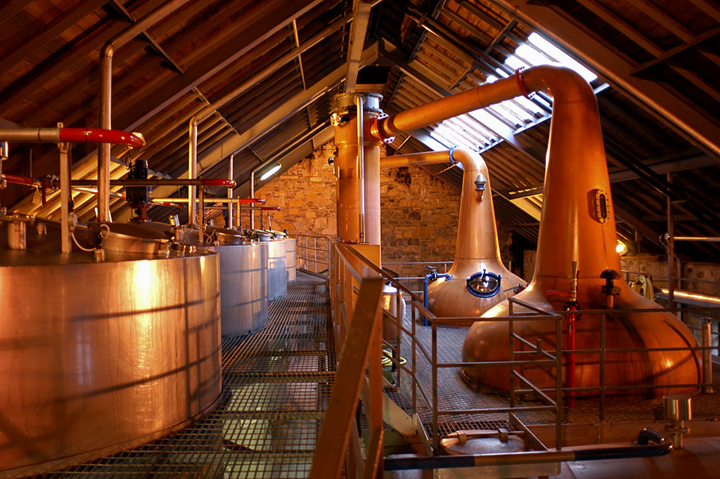
- Speyside distillery's stillhouse

Region: Speyside
- Location: Tromie Mills, Kingussie PH21 1NS, Scotland, United Kingdom
- Coordinates: 57.0727°N 4.0024°W
- Owner: Harvey's of Edinburgh
- Founded: 1990; 36 years ago
- Founder: George Christie
- Architect: Organic Architects
- Status: Closed
- Water source: River Tromie
- No. of stills: 1 wash still 1 spirit still
- Capacity: 600,000 L
- Mothballed: 2025
- Website: speysidedistillery.co.uk

Speyside distillery was a Scotch whisky distillery near the hamlet of Drumguish in the Speyside region of Scotland, close to the village of Kingussie. It produced SPEY and Beinn Dubh single malts, and Byron's Gin. It closed following a change in leaseholder, and construction of Glen Tromie distillery is ongoing on the former Speyside distillery site.

== History ==
The distillery was originally the site of an old barley mill built in the 1760s. Purchased in 1962 by George Christie, it was slowly converted by Christie and a stonemason called Alex Fairlie over the next 2 decades. The distillery buildings were finished in 1987. It took another three years until whisky production started in 1990.

Two copper pot stills of traditional shape were installed. Because large-scale production was never one of Christie's objectives, they have since remained some of the smallest in Scotland. The Glenspey mash tun was the last fitted by Newmill Engineering before they closed down.

Though small, the distillery could produce 600,000 litres of alcohol per annum. The distillery is the second most southerly whisky distillery in Speyside and takes its water directly from the River Tromie.

Harvey's of Edinburgh took on ownership of the distillery in 2012. The company prioritised exports to Taiwan, where more than one million bottles of SPEY are sold each year.

Harvey's leased the distillery buildings to the Speyside Distillers Co. who took on operations at the site. The lease expired in 2025, and the distillery is closed pending a move to a new distillery at Strathmashie. The mash tun, stills, and washbacks have been removed and stored at Forsyths Ltd in Rothes whilst the new location is prepared. John Harvey McDonough, CEO of Harvey's, said in May 2025, "The whisky from Speyside Distillery is now from a lost distillery. There will never be another Speyside Distillery".

Glasgow Whisky purchased the Kingussie site in 2021 and announced plans to build a new distillery there after the Speyside Distillers Co. lease expires, which will be called Glen Tromie distillery. The new distillery will be energy-efficient, aiming to achieve zero carbon emissions.

== Products ==
The distillery produced single malt Scotch whisky and gin.

Single malt expressions in the SPEY range included the core range of Tenne, Trutina, Fumare, Chairman's Choice and Royal Choice. Limited Editions included a SPEY 10, 12 and 18 year old, and cask strength versions of the Trutina and Fumare.

There was a single expression of Beinn Dubh, which was matured in heavily-charred ruby port casks. The name is a reference to Ben Macdui in the Cairngorms.

Historically the Christie family had produced Drumguish, Speyside & Glentromie with bottlings under other names including the blends Glen Hood, Scottish Prince plus cask strength single malts under the name Scotts Selection.

The gin was released under the Byron's Gin name, and uses botanicals and herbs from the grounds of the distillery. There were two variants, one made using bird cherry and the other made using melancholy thistle. The bottle depicted Lord Byron.

== In popular culture ==
Speyside distillery featured in the BBC TV show Monarch of the Glen, under the name "Lagganmore".

== See also ==
- Whisky
- Scotch whisky
- List of whisky brands
- List of distilleries in Scotland
