= Yearling =

Yearling may refer to:

- Yearling (horse), a horse between one and two years old
- Yearling Books, an imprint of Penguin Random House established in 1966
- The Yearling, a 1938 novel by Marjorie Kinnan Rawlings

== See also ==
- The Yearling (disambiguation)
