= Dungaree =

Dungaree or dungarees may refer to:

- Dungaree (fabric), similar to denim
- Jeans, denim trousers (mainly US)
- Overalls (mainly UK and Commonwealth, as well as US)
- A U.S. Navy working uniform
