= Concession =

Concession may refer to:

== General ==
- Concession (contract) (sometimes called a concession agreement), a contractual right to carry on a certain kind of business or activity in an area, such as to explore or develop its natural resources or to operate a "concession stand" within a venue
- Concession stand, a temporary or permanent booth that sells snacks or fast food, typically found in movie theaters, amusement parks, fairs, public swimming pools, or festivals
- Concessions and leases in international relations, territories in one state given to another state
  - Concession (territory), an area within one country that is administered by another, usually conceded by a weaker country to a stronger one
  - Foreign concessions in China, an example of the above
- Concession (politics), failure to challenge or cessation of challenging, as in "conceding an election" or "conceding a game"
- A step taken during negotiation whereby one party offers up something of value to them in order to work towards an agreement
- Concessional loan, a loan with below-market terms
- Concession road, a grid-based road system in Ontario and Quebec
- Concession, a figure of speech also known as synchoresis
- Concession (contract bridge), in contract bridge, a statement by a player as to the number of remaining tricks that he must lose
- Concession, a discounted price offered to certain classes of people, such as students or the elderly

== Locations ==
- Concession, Nova Scotia, Canada
- Concession, Zimbabwe
