= List of words having different meanings in American and British English (M–Z) =

This is the list of words having different meanings in British and American English: M–Z.

For the first portion of the list, see List of words having different meanings in American and British English (A–L).

- Asterisked (*) meanings, though found chiefly in the specified region, also have some currency in the other dialect; other definitions may be viewed by the other as Briticisms or Americanisms respectively. Additional usage notes are provided when useful.

== M ==
Word	British English meanings	Meanings common to British and American English	American English meanings
mac	raincoat (short form of Mackintosh)	(Mac) brand of Apple Inc. computers (short form of Macintosh) (MAC, followed or not by "address") unique 6-character hexadecimal serial number assigned to a data transmission device such as a computer router, an Ethernet port, or a Wi-Fi adapter, etc.	(Uncommon slang; proper n.) A term of informal address used with male strangers; generally implies more unfriendliness or disapproval than the more neutral 'pal' or 'buddy': "Get your car out of my way, Mac!" UK generally 'mate'. Cf. 'Jack.' type of pasta (short form of macaroni) – as in 'mac and cheese'
Mackintosh, Macintosh, or McIntosh	raincoat (Mackintosh, often shortened to mac)	Macintosh, brand of Apple Inc. computers (often shortened to Mac) (wrongly) McIntosh Red, a type of apple	
mail	(used in Royal Mail, name of the British postal system; cf. postal) (Scot.) a payment (tax, rent, etc.) (Scot.) a travelling bag or pack	(n.) postal system of a nation letters, packages, etc. sent by post; as delivered to individual, orig. US, UK often post (n. & v.) e-mail, (n.) armour, as in "chainmail"	(v.) send a letter (UK: post or send); noun originated mail carrier & mailman (UK: postman), mailbox (UK: postbox; letter box), mail slot, mail drop, etc.
mailbox		file for storing electronic mail (or related computing or voicemail usage)	item of street furniture serving as a receptacle for outgoing mail (UK: post box; letter box; pillar box); a receptacle for incoming paper mail (UK: letter box)
main line	major railway line (as the West Coast Main Line); compare trunk	major vein (as for drug injection purposes) (orig. 1930s US slang); also used as a v.; main line stars	railroad's primary track, or a primary artery, route, road, or connection Philadelphia Main Line mainline Protestant churches
mains	domestic power supply	water mains, the principal underground pipe for conveying water to residential and business properties	
major	(in the past, in English public schools) used to denote the eldest of two or more pupils with the same surname ("Bloggs major") (US: Sr.)	important or significant (n.) rank between captain and lieutenant colonel in the army and marines.	(n.) a college/university student's main field of specialization ("his major is physics"); the student himself ("he is a physics major"); (v.) to pursue a major ("he majored in physics") (compare minor; UK: compare read) (n.) rank between captain and lieutenant colonel in the air force (UK squadron leader) and in some police agencies (UK approx. superintendent).
majority (politics)	the greatest number of votes difference of votes between first and second place (US: plurality)		more than half of all votes, people, etc. (UK: absolute majority)
make out		to draw up, to seek to make it appear, to fabricate a story to see with difficulty; to understand the meaning of	to kiss (see Making out) to succeed or profit ("She made out well on that deal.") *
marinara sauce	sauce containing seafood, usu. in a tomato base		red sauce containing tomatoes and herbs, often with meat but never with seafood (UK: napolitana sauce)
marquee	large, open-sided tent installed outdoors for temporary functions *		signage placed over the entrance to a hotel, theatre, or cinema (attrib.) the ability (of a show) to draw audience, "box office" ("marquee value") a prominent celebrity or athlete ("marquee player")
mate	friend (US: pal or friend) informal term of address ("hello mate")	animal's sexual partner checkmate, the winning of a game of chess an officer on a merchant ship	spouse or partner
mean (adj.)	stingy, miserly, selfish	of inferior quality, contemptible a statistical average (see mean)	unpleasant, unkind, vicious *
median		statistical average (see median) geometric median median nerve	portion of a divided highway used to separate opposing traffic (UK central reservation)
meet with		to face (as a situation), experience ("If you can meet with triumph and disaster, and treat those two impostors just the same" – Kipling); to encounter for the first time (How I Met Your Mother)	to have a meeting with (as people) ("Vice president meets with Iraqi officials", CNN) *(UK generally meet (transitive) or meet up with)
mezzanine		intermediate floor between main floors of a building	lowest balcony in a theatre, or the first few rows of seats thereof (UK usu. dress circle)
mid-Atlantic		in the middle of the Atlantic Ocean, halfway between UK & US; an English-speaking accent with features of both British and American speakers	region of the U.S. that includes all or some of the states between New York and South Carolina (exact definition of Mid-Atlantic States may vary)
middle class	better off than 'working class', but not rich, i.e., a narrower term than in the U.S. and often negative		ordinary; not rich although not destitute, generally a positive term
midway		(adv.) in the centre of a line or period	(n.) part of a fair in which there are games, rides, etc.
military	relating specifically to the British Army (dated)	relating to armed forces in general	
minor	(in the past, in English public schools) used to denote the youngest of two or more pupils with the same surname ("Bloggs minor") (US: Jr.)	not very important see minor (law), major and minor (n.) a person under 18 years old, generally, and for legal reasons more specifically (as in "the name of the defendant is withheld because he is a minor"), or under an age legally required for certain behavior (such as drinking, voting, driving, purchasing alcohol, renting R-rated movies and so on), or under the age of consent.	(n.) secondary academic subject (compare major) ("has a major in biology and a minor in English"); (v.) to study as one's minor ("she minored in English") minor league;
miss out	to omit	to lose a chance; usu. used with on	
mobile (n.)	mobile phone (US: cell phone)	decorative structure suspended so as to turn freely in the air	
mobile home	mobile, non-motorised piece of equipment with living facilities; a caravan (q.v.)		type of manufactured dwelling transported to the home site using wheels attached to the structure
momentarily		for a moment	in a moment; very soon
mono		(adj.) monophonic (of reproduced sound, e.g. radio or CD player using a single speaker) monochrome	(n.) infectious mononucleosis, disease caused by Epstein-Barr virus (UK: glandular fever)
moot	(adj.) debatable ("a moot point") (v.) to bring up for debate see also moot court		(adj.) irrelevant ("a moot point") (orig. legal, now in common use)
mortuary (n.)	building or room (as in a hospital) for the storage of human remains (US: morgue)		funeral home, funeral parlor
motorbike	a motorcycle		lightweighted, small motorcycle
motor car, motorcar	(formal) a car (motor vehicle) (US: automobile)		self-propelled railway vehicle
MP	Member of Parliament	Military police other expansions	Northern Mariana Islands (ISO 3166-1 alpha-2 country code and U.S. postal abbreviation MP); Missouri Pacific Railroad (reporting mark MP)
muffin	thick round baked yeast roll, usually toasted and served with butter (US: English muffin)		confection similar to a cupcake but unfrosted and less sweet, sometimes even savory (e.g., corn muffin) *(UK: American muffin)
muffler		a scarf	device to silence an automobile (UK: silencer) or gramophone
mum	mother, as addressed or referred to by her child (US: mom)	silent, as in "keep mum"	chrysanthemum
mummy	mother, as addressed or referred to by her child (US: mommy)	Ancient Egyptian mummy, chemically preserved corpse any preserved corpse (Mexican mumia)	
mush	(informal) term of address, often hostile (possibly from Romany "man") (informal) face	a soft wet mass	thick cornmeal porridge command to dogs to start pulling a sledge *

== N ==
Word	British English meanings	Meanings common to British and American English	American English meanings
napkin	nappy (q.v.), diaper (dated, not well known)	piece of material used to protect garments from spilled food or to remove food residues from around the mouth [formerly esp. US; alternative UK term serviette is becoming obsolete]	piece of cloth or paper used to protect garments, (typically sanitary napkin) absorbent piece of material worn by a woman while menstruating *(UK usu. sanitary towel)
nappy	folded cloth or other absorbent material drawn up between the legs and fastened around the waist, usu. worn by infants to counter incontinence (US: diaper)		twisted or kinked, considered insulting when applied to hair, esp. that of persons of African descent (also called napped)
natter	Idle, pleasant chatter (US: small talk, chitchat)		(natter on) Constant, annoying chatter
nervy	nervous, fidgety		bold, presumptuous
NHS	The National Health Service, a government-run health care plan funded by British taxpayers and available to all citizens.		The National Honor Society, an American scholastic organization open to high schoolers (in grades 10–12, see grade) who excel in academics, leadership skills, citizenship, and character.
nick	prison or police station (slang) to steal (slang) to arrest (slang)	small cut (computer jarg.) nickname the nick of time = "just in time"	
nickel		the metallic element (Ni)	5 cent coin
non-profit		(adj.) not conducted with the aim of making a profit, usually for the purpose of health, education, social improvement, political or charitable aims	(n.) a non-profit organization, particularly a 501(c) organization. There is no direct equivalent in Britain for the latter term which would include, but would not be restricted to all registered charities in Britain but, for example, building societies would also be considered non-profits in the United States.
nonplussed		bewildered, unsure how to respond	unfazed
nonce	a sex offender; in particular, a child molester (slang)	the present moment a word used only once a single-use token in a cryptographic protocol	
nor	neither * ("'She didn't come.' 'Nor did he.'") (Scotland & Ireland) than ("someone better nor me")	and not, or (not) ("neither sad nor happy"; "he never eats, nor does he ever feel hungry")	
notch		(n.) An indentation or incision on an edge or surface. (v.) Make notches in.	(n.) A deep, narrow mountain pass.
notion		an idea, impression, whim, theory or conception	small item, particularly of the type used in sewing
nous	common sense, alertness, shrewdness (informal)	mind, the intellect, reason (philosophy)	

== O ==
Word	British English meanings	Meanings common to British and American English	American English meanings
oblique (n.)	slash symbol (/)	a muscle neither parallel nor perpendicular to the long axis of a body or limb	
onesie (n.)	Onesie (jumpsuit): One-piece garment worn by older children and adults as loungewear.		Infant bodysuit: a bodysuit worn by infants; Onesies is a registered trademark in the US for infant bodysuits, but the term is used widely as a general one.
office	(cap.) a government department ("Colonial Office", "Foreign and Commonwealth Office") (UK also: Ministry e.g. 'Ministry of Defence', US: Department e.g. 'Department of Defense') (pl.) the outbuildings and dependencies of a dwelling (as an estate)	a place of business; a position or function a particular division of an administrative unit ("Patent Office")	the place where a physician or dentist practices (UK: surgery)
optician	(ophthalmic optician) professional who tests eyes and prescribes lenses (US: optometrist)	professional who dispenses lenses and spectacles (also dispensing optician in the UK)	
optometrist		ophthalmic optician	in the U.S., optometrist and ophthalmologist are separate, opticians are the same as UK dispensing opticians
Oriental	a person from East/South East Asia. Contrast 'Asian', meaning a person from South Asia.	a thing from Asia e.g. "Oriental carpet".	a person from anywhere in Asia, other than Western Asia or Russia. Considered pejorative when used to describe persons. Polite US speakers use Asian instead, even for people from China and Korea.
ouster		a person who ousts (legal) dispossession, ejection or eviction, particularly when wrongful	the act of forcing the removal of someone from a position of influence or power
outhouse	building outside but adjacent to or attached to a main dwelling e.g. a shed or barn		outside toilet
outside lane	the part of the road nearest the vehicles going in the opposite direction, used especially by faster vehicles (US: inside lane)	(in both cases the term applies to the rightmost lane in the direction concerned)	the part of the road nearest the edge, used especially by slower-moving vehicles (UK: inside lane)
overall(s) (n.)	loose-fitting protective outer garment (US: coverall)		(in pl.) sturdy protective bib trousers; dungarees, bib overalls

== P ==
Word	British English meanings	Meanings common to British and American English	American English meanings
pacifier		something or somebody that brings peace	rubber teat for babies (UK: dummy)
paddle	a walk through shallow water, especially at the seaside (US approx.: wade, also UK usage)	an oar used to propel a canoe, kayak or a small boat the action of using such an oar	to strike a child with a paddle as a form of corporal punishment (dated usage)
palette knife	A knife with a broad, flat, flexible blade used in cooking. (US: offset spatula)	A knife used in painting to apply paint to a canvas or other surface.	
panda	(panda car) police car (slang) (US: zebra, black-and-white)	Type of animal, e.g. giant panda, red panda	
pantomime	A form of comedic, usually family oriented musical stage production.		silent acting, usu. without props, by mime artist (UK: mime)
pants	underpants (also briefs or boxers) of poor quality (slang) (of a situation) bad, unfortunate (slang). Although refers to trousers in parts of Northern England.		Outerwear from the waist to the ankles (trousers) * (wear the pants in the family) be masculine, be the breadwinner, perform the husband's role (derog.) (spoken esp. of a wife, usage becoming obsolete)
paraffin	kerosene		a waxy fraction of petroleum commonly used to make candles (UK: paraffin wax)
paralytic	extremely drunk (slang)	relating to or affected by paralysis	
park	a tract of ground kept in its natural state, about or adjacent to a residence, as for the preservation of game, for walking, riding, or the like (esp. Scotland) a pasture or field area for the parking of motor vehicles ("a car park") (sports) used in the names of many association football or rugby grounds, esp. in Britain ('Hampden Park', 'Eden Park') see also country park	outdoor area for recreational uses ("Central Park", "Hyde Park") national park (orig. US)	any of various areas designated for certain purposes *, such as amusement park, theme park, industrial park, trailer park, memorial park (a cemetery) (sports) enclosed ground for ball games, oftenest the baseball park a level valley among the mountains (as the Rocky Mountains); also, an area of open grassland, or one for cultivation, esp. if among the woods
parking		the act of parking (a vehicle)	To engage in romantic intimacy in a parked vehicle. (regional) turf strip between sidewalk and street (many regional synonyms exist; there is no standard name).
parkway	a railway station with parking areas intended for commuters		generally, an open landscaped limited-access highway (q.v.) (see article) regional term for parking (q.v.)
pass out	to graduate from a training centre of a disciplined service (military, police etc.)	to become unconscious; to distribute	
patience	any of a family of one-player card games (US: solitaire, q.v.)	the quality of being patient	
pavement	a paved strip at the side of a road, reserved for pedestrians (US: sidewalk)		the road surface
PC	police constable	politically correct personal computer other expansions	
pecker	courage or pluck (keep your pecker up) to remain cheerful (US and UK also: keep your chin up)		penis (slang)
peckish	slightly hungry*		irritable or angry
peg	(n.) (often clothes peg) a wooden or plastic device for fastening laundry on a clothesline (US: clothespin) (v.) to fasten (laundry) on a clothesline	(n.) a cylindrical wooden, metal etc. object used to fasten or as a bearing between objects (n.) a small amount of whisky (compare dram or half) (v.) to fix or pin down (v.) to hit with a projectile (v.) to engage in a sexual practice in which a woman performs anal sex on a man by penetrating the man's anus with a strap-on dildo	(n.) a throw (as in baseball) (v.) to identify or classify (someone as being something) *
penny	(pl. pence, or, when referring to coins, pennies) 1/100 (formerly, 1/240) of the pound sterling [listed here to reflect ordinary usage]	a small amount usu. in contrast to a larger one ("penny wise, pound foolish", common phrase in both British and American usage)	(pl. pennies) a cent (esp. the coin) (penny-ante) trivial, small-time.
period		section of time menstruation row of the periodic table	punctuation mark used at the end of a sentence (interj.) used at the end of a statement to emphasise its finality *("You are not going to that concert, period!") (UK: full stop for both senses)
pinafore	A sleeveless, collarless dress worn over a shirt (Jumper (dress))		A style of apron (Pinafore)
pint	20 imperial fluid ounces (about 568 ml, 19.2 US fl oz or 6/5 US pt), pint of beer, lager or cider ("Pour us a pint")		16 US fluid ounces (about 473 ml, 16.65 imp fl oz or 5/6 imp pt)
piss	(on the piss) drinking heavily, going out for the purpose of drinking heavily (to piss off) to go away	urine (usu. vulgar) urinate (usu. vulgar) low-quality beer (vulgar) (to piss off) to incite to anger, to enrage (to take the piss) to mock	
pissed	intoxicated, drunk*(often pissed as a newt; sometimes pissed up)	urinated (usu. vulgar) (pissed off) angry, irritated	angry, irritated
pitch	outdoor site for a stall or some other business site for a tent (US: campsite, q.v.) playing field for a particular sport (football pitch, rugby pitch, cricket pitch, etc.) (US: field)	an attempt to persuade somebody to do something, usu. to accept a business proposal a sticky black substance obtained from tar the slope of a roof rotation on a lateral axis (as an aircraft or spacecraft) the frequency of a sound to erect a tent to discard (in various card games, e.g., bridge)	in baseball, the delivery of a baseball by a pitcher to a batter (slang) to dispose of, to throw away a brief summary of a broader work or idea meant to be attractive to a third party e.g. "What's the pitch?"
pitcher	a large container (often earthenware), usually round with a narrow neck, used for holding water or another liquid (US: jug)		any container with a handle and lip or spout for liquids* (UK: jug) baseball player who pitches (throws) baseball towards the batter (UK: bowler) (LGBT slang, from baseball) a top or dominant partner
pitman	a miner working in a pit	the man that stands in a pit when sawing timber (with another man standing above)	a connecting rod (as in a sawmill) a master barbecuer, the person responsible for managing a barbecue pit.
plant	machinery, industrial equipment	a vegetable organism, a factory an undercover operative	
plaster	an adhesive bandage placed on a minor cut or scrape (UK also: sticking/sticky plaster, Elastoplast; US: Band-Aid); a cast of plaster of Paris ("a leg in plaster")	a pastelike mixture that hardens when applied to walls and ceilings (plastered) drunk	
platform	when appended with a number signifies a specific platform in a station (US: track)	a raised elongated structure along the side of a track in a railway station; a raised level surface; a raised level surface from which a speaker addresses an audience	
plimsoll, plimsol, plimsole.	noun: a rubber-soled cloth shoe; a sneaker.	waterline to show the level the water should reach when the ship is properly loaded [syn: load line], named after Samuel Plimsoll	
point	(pl.) railway turnout *(US: switch) (power point) electrical socket (US: outlet) cape or promontory jutting into sea (full point) syn. with full stop (q.v.)	Many, many uses; see Point (disambiguation)	piece of land jutting into any body of water, esp. a river ("points and bends"); a prominence or peak (of mountains, hills, rocks), also an extremity of woods or timber
pontoon	blackjack, twenty-one	a buoyant device	
pop	to place or put ("I popped the book on the table")	a sharp explosive sound (noun and verb) pop music carbonated soft drink (U.S. usage is regional; also: soda, soda pop) (pop in) to arrive unexpectedly	father (colloquial) (slang) to shoot; to kill, esp. with a gun (n.) a sudden increase (as in price) (orig. Stock exchange) *
porter	doorman, gatekeeper, or building maintenance worker *	bearer of burdens a style of beer	railway sleeping car attendant
post (v.)	to send a letter *(US: mail)	to display on a noticeboard or bulletin board, Internet forum, etc.	to announce ("the company posted a first-quarter profit of $100 million") to inform ("keep me posted") *
postal		related to the paper mail system	(used in the name of the United States Postal Service; see mail) (going postal) to commit a sudden, irrational burst of rage (slang)
pound sign		symbol of the pound sterling (£) (GBP)	number sign, octothorpe (#) (UK: hash sign)
precinct	a pedestrian zone in a city or town ("a shopping precinct")	a space enclosed (as by walls)	subdivision of a county, town, etc. for the purpose of conducting elections section of a city patrolled by a police unit; the police station in such a section
prep(aratory) school	(in England) fee-paying private junior school (which prepares students for public school)		fee-paying private senior school (which prepares students for college) (UK: public school or independent school)
pressman, presswoman	a journalist employed by a newspaper (US: newspaperman/newspaperwoman (rare), or by specific job, e.g. 'reporter')		one who operates a printing press
pressurise (UK), pressurize (US & UK)	insistently influence, or attempt to influence, someone else ("The manager pressurised his assistant to work late") (US & UK also: pressure)	subject a volume of gas or liquid to physical pressure, as the atmospheric pressure within an aircraft ("To protect the Aircraft's structure, the plane was pressurized to 8000 ft.")	
proctor	variant of the word procurator, is a person who takes charge or acts for another; title of various legal and ecclesiastical appointments.	university official known particularly as being responsible for matters of student discipline	an examination supervisor (UK: invigilator)
professor	holder of a chair in a university, the highest academic rank (the usual order being Lecturer, Senior Lecturer, Principal Lecturer / Reader, Professor)		academic faculty of all ranks: Assistant Professor, Associate Professor, and (Full) Professor (the latter being largely equivalent to the UK meaning)
projects		plans; temporary endeavors undertaken to create a unique product or service	publicly subsidized, low-income housing development – see public housing (UK: housing/council estate. Also informally scheme)
prom	shortening of 'promenade concert', originally one of a series of concerts (The Proms) held as part of a classical music festival that takes place in the late summer based around the Royal Albert Hall in London, but now also used elsewhere shortening of 'promenade', a raised walk next to the beach in seaside resorts		dance/party held for pupils to celebrate the end of a school year/graduation, a shortening of 'promenade', a formal parade *
protest (v.t.)	to forcefully express an opinion, to advocate: "The prisoner protested his innocence."		to campaign or demonstrate against: "The prisoner's friends protested the judge's decision." (UK: protest against)
public school	long-established and prestigious fee-paying independent school in England or Wales (note that not all private schools are classified as public schools) (US: prep school)		tax-supported school controlled by a local governmental authority (UK: state school) *(also in Scotland & Northern Ireland)
pudding	dessert course of a meal a heavy dessert or main course (e.g. steak and kidney pudding), often suet-based used in the name of some other savoury dishes (e.g. black pudding, pease pudding)		a creamy dessert (UK: blancmange) term of affection
pull	to persuade someone to be one's date or sex partner (slang) (on the pull) seeking a date or sex partner (slang)	to move something towards oneself an injury to a muscle, tendon, or ligament, e.g. "I've pulled my hamstring."	to carry out a task (esp. milit.) ("to pull guard duty") authority, influence ("He's got pull in that office.") (pull rank) the act of a supervisor exercising authority over a subordinate.
pull off	(of a vehicle) to start moving	to succeed in a task	
pump (shoe)	(regional) a plimsoll (US: sneaker)	the word (of unknown origin) has variously denoted a pantofle, a low thin sole shoe, a formal men's shoe (Reebok Pump) a brand of athletic shoe with an internal inflation mechanism	usu. women's high(ish) heeled shoe (UK similar: court shoe, q.v.)
punk		follower of Punk rock	worthless person; from conventional societal perspective any young outlaw or tough; from perspective of outlaws and others valuing physical fighting, a coward to play a prank or practical joke on someone
purse	feminine money container or wallet (US: coin purse)	in boxing etc., the money to be awarded in a prize fight	handbag
pussy		a cat (becoming less common in the U.S., due to the other meanings); Slang term for vagina	a coward (vulgar and highly derogatory)
pylon	electricity pylon, part of an electric power transmission network *(US: mast or transmission tower)	A large architectural feature, usually found as one of a pair at the entrance to ancient Egyptian temples – see Pylon (architecture)	traffic cone; temporary traffic lane separator. support structure for suspension bridge or highway

== Q ==
Word	British English meanings	Meanings common to British and American English	American English meanings
quart	1/4 (UK) gallon or 2 (UK) pints. Liquid measure approximately 1.136 litres (6/5 of an American quart).		1/4 (US) gallon or 2 (US) pints. Liquid measure equal to 0.946 litres (5/6 of a British quart).
quarter		one of four equal parts into which something is divided, as a quarter-hour or, especially for financial purposes, a quarter of a year; in generic usage (as in fractions), US usu. fourth	25 cents (a fourth of a dollar)
queue	a group of persons, usually waiting for something, arranged in order of arrival *(US: line)	an ordered sequence of objects, from which the first one in is also the first one out (cf. Queue (data structure))	
quid	colloquial term for pound sterling (plural is quid also; in Ireland it referred to the punt and now refers to the euro) (related US: buck)	a measure (mouthful) of chewing tobacco	
quite	to some extent or degree, e.g. in the phrase "quite good" meaning "mediocre, acceptable" or "good, well done" (a meiotic usage, depending on voice intonation) agreeing with a given statement, often expressing reluctant agreement or disbelief ("I'm innocent, and this document proves it!" "Quite.") according to intonation)	to the fullest extent or degree ("All art is quite useless" – Oscar Wilde) to a great extent or degree	

== R ==
Word	British English meanings	Meanings common to British and American English	American English meanings
rabbit	(v.) (slang) to talk at length, usually about trivial things; usually to 'rabbit on' (Cockney rhyming slang Rabbit and pork = talk)	(n.) the animal rabbit, a lagomorph	(rabbit ears) (slang) TV antenna (usage becoming obsolete)
rad		acronym from Radiation Absorbed Dose, an obsolete unit for absorbed ionizing radiation dose abbreviation of radian abbreviation of radix	different or interesting, exceptional; synonym for cool (short for "radical")
railroad	tramway (obsolete)	(v.) to coerce to convict with undue haste or with insufficient evidence	the general term for the system of mass transit using trains running on rails: see usage of the terms railroad and railway (v.) to work on the railroad to transport by railroad see also at underground
railway	the general term for the system of mass transit using trains running on rails: see usage of the terms railroad and railway		tramway
raisin	(UK usage excludes currants and sultanas)	a large dark grape, dried	any dried grape
rambler	one that rambles (as a hiker), see Ramblers	a type of rose one who talks excessively, often without making cohesive points (to ramble on)	a style of house, usu. a ranch-style house (see also Rambler (automobile), Nash Rambler)
randy	a slang term meaning sexually aroused (American horny) *		a male or female given name or nickname deriving from the names Randall, Randolph, or Miranda
range	a line, collection, etc. of products or merchandise, as in top of the range (US: top of the line) a type of kitchen stove like that featured on the TV programme The 1900 House	a series of things in a line (as mountains) a sequence or scale between limits a place where shooting is practised and the distance a projectile will travel, as in Maximum Effective Range. an area over which a species of animal or plant is found	a cooking stove with an oven and burners on the top surface an open area for the grazing of livestock a series of townships (q.v.), a Public Land Survey System unit of land east or west from a Principal meridian
raunchy		Lewd, vulgar, sexually explicit	foul-smelling, dirty raunch (n.): stench, miasma
read	to study a subject at university* ("he is reading physics") (roughly approximate US: major (in) / study)	to peruse written material	to read law, the historical practice, still allowed in some U.S. jurisdictions, of becoming a lawyer by studying under the supervision of another lawyer rather than by earning a law degree
reader	the second highest academic rank at a university, below professor (US equivalent: associate professor)	one who reads	a teaching assistant who reads and grades examination papers.
receptionist	hotel reservation desk worker (US: clerk) see also concierge	front desk employee in business establishments, organisations, or hospitals	
recess (time)		remission or suspension of business or procedure	pause between classes at school (UK: break, playtime, Lunchtime)
redcap	a military police officer		a baggage porter (as at a train station)
redundant	laid off from employment, usu. because no longer needed ("The company made 100 workers redundant") (US: laid off)	unnecessary; repetitive	backup; auxiliary system
regular		normal, customary following a uniform pattern in space or time (of a geometric shape) having equal sides and angles frequent one who frequents a place a full-time professional member of a military organisation (see Regular army) (US: active duty)	of an ordinary kind; also, nice or agreeable ("a regular guy") of an ordinary or medium size * unmodified, especially non-dietary/sugar-free/fat-free * non-decaffeinated coffee lowest grade of gasoline (historically: leaded gasoline)
remit	(n.) set of responsibilities ("within my remit"; "to have a remit") (pronounced /ˈriːmɪt/)	(v.) to defer; in law, to transfer a case to a lower court; to send money; to cancel. (pronounced /rɪˈmɪt/)	
rent (v.)		to pay money in exchange for the right to use a house, land or other real property (BrE "let")	to pay money in exchange for the right to use moveable property such as a car (BrE "hire")
restroom	a room for staff to take their breaks in; a staffroom (US: breakroom)		a room in a public place, containing a toilet
retainer		amount of money paid in order to retain the services of another, a person who part of a retinue	a device for straightening teeth (UK: brace)
retreat		(v.) to go backwards, especially (military) to move away from the enemy; to withdraw (n.) a period of withdrawal from society for prayer or meditation	a period of group withdrawal for study or instruction under a group leader
review (v.)		to reassess, inspect, perform a subsequent reading to write a review	to study again (as in preparing for an examination) (UK: revise), hence review (n.)
revise	to study again (as in preparing for an examination) (US: review), hence revision	to inspect, amend, correct, improve, esp. written material	
rider		a person who rides a horse, bicycle or motorcycle an addition or amendment to a document or law a condition or proviso	a person who travels on a train or bus (UK: passenger)
ring (v.)	to call (someone) by telephone	to sound a bell	(ring up) *to total up a customer's purchases on a cash register
rise (increase)	an increase in wages (US: raise)	an increase in amount, value, price, etc.	
roach	The assembled filter tip of a marijuana joint	Fish including members of the family Cyprinidae	Cockroach (colloquial). The extinguished remnants of a marijuana joint
roast	(colloquial) to reprimand severely.	(v.) to cook in an oven; (n.) meat so cooked	(n.) an event where an individual is ridiculed for the sake of comedy; (v.) to host or perform such an event
rocket	An edible salad green, called arugula in American English.	A vehicle that obtains thrust from a rocket engine	
roommate		a person with whom one shares a bedroom	(also roomie) a person with whom one shares a house or apartment (UK: housemate or flatmate)
root (v.)		to fix; to rummage; to take root or grow roots	to cheer ("I will be rooting for you"); to dig or look for (root around) *
rotary		a machine acting by rotation (cap.) organisation whose members comprise Rotary Clubs	a circular road intersection (US also traffic circle, UK usu. roundabout; see articles)
rotor		a rotating part of a mechanical device particularly the rotating wing of a helicopter or similar aircraft	in vehicle braking, the metal disc to which the brake pads are applied (UK brake disc or disc)
roundabout	a merry-go-round	a detour or circuitous path a circular road intersection	a type of men's jacket used in the past (see e.g. Mark Twain)
row (n.)	(Pronounced /ˈraʊ/, to rhyme with "cow") a noisy quarrel *; a continual loud noise ("Who's making that row?")	(Pronounced /ˈroʊ/, to rhyme with "toe") a line of objects, often regularly spaced (as seats in a theatre, vegetable plants in a garden etc.) a line of entries in a table, etc. (as opposed to a column) an instance of rowing (as in a boat)	a series of prison cells ("death row") a particular street or area of a town (as in skid row, dilapidated neighbourhood haunted by vagrants, misfits, etc.) a series of row houses (row house) town house, q.v.
rubber (countable noun)	pencil eraser	the duration of a match in certain games (e.g., bridge)	condom (rubbers) waterproof boots (UK: wellingtons, wellies)
rug	a (usually thick) piece of fabric used for warmth (especially on a bed); blanket	a small covering for a floor (slang) a wig; hairpiece	
run	(n.) a leisure drive or ride ("a run in the car")	(v.) senses orig. US and now common are: to be a candidate in an election (UK also stand); to manage or provide for (a business, a family, etc.); the idioms run scared, run into. More s.v. home run; see wiktionary for additional meanings, a type of cage which is made so that animals (e.g. hamsters, rabbits, guinea pigs, etc.) can run around in it.	(v.) to propose (someone) as a candidate to drive past ("to run a red light") to hunt (as the buffalo or the deer) (n.) an instance of running for office a creek (q.v.)
run-in	the final part of a race; approach to something, also run-up (q.v.)		an argument or altercation * a chance meeting (negative connotation)
rundown (n.)	a reduction (as of an establishment)	a detailed summary (orig. US slang)	a type of play in baseball tired, depressed.
runner (n.)	to do a runner is to leave suddenly without notice, typically from a taxi or restaurant without payment (US: dine-and-dash, from a restaurant)	a competitor in a race	
run-up	the period preceding an event (as an election) *; in cricket, the approach a bowler makes when preparing to deliver the ball	the act of running up	a sudden increase (as in price) (orig. Stock exchange) *

== S ==
Word	British English meanings	Meanings common to British and American English	American English meanings
saloon	closed car having two or (usu.) four doors, a front and rear seat and a separate boot/trunk (US: sedan) (saloon bar) posh bar within a pub or hotel passengers' lounge on a liner or luxury train (US approx.: parlor car)	officers' dining room on a merchant ship	bar, especially in the American Old West bar that serves only spirits and no food a room in a house used for receiving guests; a salon
scalp (v.)		to cut the scalp off; to take something away (n.) trophy, spoils of victory (informal)	to resell (as tickets) at higher prices (UK: tout) to trade (as stocks) for quick profits
scheme	official systematic plan (as of the government) ("a pension scheme") (Scotland) Low-cost public housing (US: project)	a plan, often secret or devious; a plot ("criminal scheme")	
school	place of primary or secondary education	grouping of departments or large department within a university faculty (among other meanings, e.g., a group of experts sharing perspective or methods, or a group of fish)	any educational institution; in school: state of being a pupil in any school normally serving minor children of any age, or in a college or university at any level; at school: usually, physically present on campus. (UK: at school for both)
scrappy	not neatly organised or poor a scrappy player is one who sometimes plays well, but often plays badly.	fragmentary	bellicose or fightingly determined a scrappy player is one who compensates for a lack of size or speed with grit and determination.
second (v.)	to transfer temporarily to alternative employment (pronounced /sɨˈkɒnd/, to rhyme with "beyond")	to endorse, support, or bring reinforcements	
section (v.t.)	to detain under the Mental Health Act 1983; On section, detained in a mental hospital.	to cut or slice into sections	
sedan		a chair or windowed cabin, carried by at least two porters in front and behind	a common car body style (UK: saloon, q.v.)
seeded (grapes, etc.)	with the seeds left in		having had the seeds removed (uncommon usage) (also seedless, used in UK)
semi	semi-detached house (US: duplex), semi-erection (vulgar)		semi-trailer truck (UK: articulated lorry)
set square	a triangular object used in technical drawing (US: triangle)		a T-square (also used in technical drawing)
shade		penumbra, partial obscurity; nuance (pl.) sunglasses (orig. US); reminder of the past	window blind a sneer, or derisive remark (slang, especially as in "throw shade")
shag	to copulate, or copulate with [understood in some (but certainly not all) demographics in the US also, see Austin Powers]	a seabird (various members of the cormorant family) a kind of fabric with a thick, long strands; often used in carpets long, matted hair (cf. Shaggy from the Scooby-Doo cartoon) a type of shredded coarse tobacco	(v.) to chase after; to chase and fetch (as a fly ball in baseball) a style of long hair with numerous layers (not matted or untidy) a kind of a dance, associated with "beach music," esp. from the Carolinas (orig. US)
shattered	exhausted	broken into many small pieces. devastated emotionally	
sherbet	a fizzy powdered confectionery		a type of frozen dessert (also spelled sherbert; UK similar: sorbet)
sheriff	chief royal peace officer of a county, now (as high sheriff) largely only a ceremonial role (England and Wales) local judge, in full sheriff-depute or sheriff-substitute (Scotland)		elected chief legal officer of a county, usu. also in charge of the county's law enforcement service; elsewhere any member of a county (vs. state or local) police
shingle	pebbles, particularly those on the seashore *	to cut a woman's hair in an overlapping style (shingles) a painful disease of the skin, caused by the chickenpox virus wooden roof tile to cover a roof with wooden tiles	sign proclaiming one's name and calling ("hang a shingle out") to cover something like a shingled roof
ship (verb), shipping		To transport goods by sea, movement of goods by sea Relationship (fandom)	To transport goods, movement of goods Shipping & handling, standard form of charge for delivery of goods (UK: Postage & packing)
shop	consumer retail establishment of any size (US: store); hence shopfront (US: storefront), shop-soiled (US: shopworn), shop assistant (US: (sales) clerk) workshop, only in combination ("machine shop")	to buy at a retail establishment of any size	small or specialized consumer retail establishment (e.g. coffee shop, dress shop); workshop; shop class: practical class at school taught in a workshop, i.e. industrial arts(overlaps with Design and Technology (England & Wales) and Technical (Scotland) curricula); shortening of Automobile repair shop (UK: garage, car mechanic).
shorts	strong alcoholic drinks served in multiples of 25 ml, sometimes with mixers (US & UK also: shots)	short trousers (US: short pants)	underpants, boxers (take it in one's shorts) endure a painful situation ("He really took it in the shorts that time.")
shot		Shot (disambiguation)	an injection with a hypodermic needle, as in the case of an inoculation (UK: jab)
shower		spray of water used to wash oneself a short period of rain	a celebratory party where gifts are given to an individual e.g. a baby shower to celebrate an imminent birth
sic		Latin for "Thus", "just so" — states that the preceding quoted material appears exactly that way in the source, usu. despite errors of spelling, grammar, usage, or fact.	pronunciation spelling of "seek" used as a dog command, and by extension as a verb meaning to set (as a dog, etc.) to attack someone ("I'll sic my attorney on you")
sick	(to be sick) to vomit (off sick) not at work because of illness (n.) vomit ("a puddle of sick")	unwell, not in good health (except with "to be" in UK English) (slang) disgusting (corruption of sickening) (slang) cool, good, interesting	(to be sick [somewhere]) nauseous (out sick) not at work because of illness
sickie	a day taken as sick leave, esp. when not actually ill		a mentally ill or perverted person (also: sicko)
sideboard	(pl.) sideburns, side-whiskers	an item of furniture also known as buffet	
siding		a dead-end railway track leading off the main line and used to store rolling stock	a short section of railroad track connected by switches with a main track, enabling trains on the same line to pass (UK: loop) external wall covering, cladding, weatherboarding
silencer	device to silence a car/automobile (US: muffler)	device to silence a firearm	
silk	a Queen's Counsel	material made from unwound silkworm cocoons (silky) smooth, having the texture of silk (cf., silky words)	the silky, pistillate flower of corn (maize) a parachute (orig. slang of the United States Air Force)
silverware	things made from silver, including bowls, spoons, etc. Also trophies won by a sports team (i.e. FA Cup, Challenge Cup...)		eating implements (spoon, fork, knife) (UK: cutlery; US also flatware)
sketchy		lacking detail or substance	questionable, disreputable
skillet	a stewing pan or saucepan, often long-handled or having short legs or feet		a frying pan*
skip (n.)	large rubbish container (US approx: Dumpster)	an act of leaping or omitting; see skip (radio), skip (in audio playback)	one who disappears without paying their debts ("finding a good skip tracer is harder than finding your debtors") (UK: Gone Away)
skive (v.)	to avoid work or school (play truant)	v. to cut or pare leather/rubber; n. an indentation made from skiving	
skivvy	a scullery maid or lowest servant doing menial work, somebody at the bottom of the pecking order	[origin of both senses is unknown; they are likely unrelated] [note that skivvy has a third distinct meaning in Australian English]	(pl.) men's underwear (trademark; colloquial when used in lower case)
slag	(derogatory) promiscuous woman (US & UK also: slut) a general insult directed at someone of either sex	A product from the iron-smelting blast furnace; mainly used in tarmac production	
slash	(colloq.) an act of urinating ("to have a slash")	to cut drastically the symbol '/' (orig. US) (also virgule, solidus; UK also: oblique, stroke) short for slash fiction, a genre of fan fiction that explores romantic or sexual relationships between same-sex characters	an open tract in a forest strewn with debris, especially from logging a swampy area
slate	(v.) to disparage ("many critics have slated the film"), hence slating	(n.) a type of rock; a greyish colour (v.) to cover with slate	(v.) to schedule *("slated for demolition") to designate (a candidate, as for political office) (n.) a list of candidates
sleeper	A horizontal member which lies beneath, and binds together, the rails of a railway. (US: railroad tie, crosstie)	A railway vehicle providing sleeping accommodation (a sleeping car). Sleeper agent – A deep cover secret agent	Sleeper (automobile), an automobile modified for high performance but with a normal-looking exterior (UK: Q-car)
sleet	snow that has partially thawed on its fall to the ground		(partially) frozen raindrops, ice pellets; a mixture of rain and snow or hail; also, glaze (q.v.)
slough (hydrology)	(usu. pronounced /ˈslaʊ/, to rhyme with "plough")	a marshy area, a swamp	a secondary channel; a small backwater; a pond (usu. pronounced /ˈsluː/ and often spelled slew)
Smarties	a sugar-coated chocolate confectionery manufactured by Nestlé (similar to M&M's)		a fruit-flavored tablet candy produced by Ce De Candy, Inc
smashed		beaten, destroyed as in "it was smashed"	Exceedingly drunk
smokestack		a system (as a pipe) for venting hot gases and smoke: such a system on buildings, locomotives (UK primarily: chimney or funnel), and ships (UK & US also: funnel)	(attrib.) heavy industry, manufacturing industry *("smokestack industries", "smokestack stocks")
smudge		a blurry spot or streak	a smouldering mass placed on the windward side to protect from frost or keep insects away (as in smudge pot)
snout	police informant tobacco (slang)	pig's nose nose (slang)	
sod	unpleasant person, originally short for sodomite ("He's a sod, isn't he?") unfortunate person when prefixed by 'poor' ("The poor sod's had his wallet nicked.") or 'silly' ("The silly sod really got it knackered."); also an exclamation of frustration, esp. as an abbreviation for sodomy: "Sod it!"	layer of grass and earth (in UK in a formal/literary sense), cf. 'sodden'	turf
soda	carbonated water, or any non-alcoholic drink made with it, but not usu. one sold ready-mixed	any of various chemical compounds containing sodium (as sodium bicarbonate or sodium carbonate), carbonated water	(regional) carbonated soft drink, usu. one sold ready-mixed (also 'pop,' 'soda pop') (UK: fizzy drink or colloquially (fizzy) pop)
solicitor	lawyer who advises clients, represents them in the lower courts, and prepares cases for barristers to try in higher courts *(considered overly formal in US)		one that solicits (e.g. contributions to charity), an advertiser, a salesperson, a promoter; often annoying chief law officer of a city, town, or government department
solitaire	peg-jumping puzzle game (see peg solitaire)		any of a family of one-player card games (see solitaire) (UK: patience)
sort (v.)	to deal with; hence sorted as expression of appreciation; (slang) to be adequately supplied with narcotics all used with out: to arrange or take care of (something) * to solve an esp. difficult situation (also reflexive) * (informal) to set (someone) straight, or to get even with (someone) sorted, to have or get fixed, have problems worked out, so things are working correctly ("He's really got it sorted now.")	to arrange or classify; often used with out	
spanner	general term for a tool used for turning nuts, bolts, etc. (US: wrench, q.v.) something interfering (US: (monkey) wrench)		a wrench with holes or pins at its end for meshing with the object to be turned (UK: C spanner)
spaz	(offensive) Incompetent, useless, disabled person (from spastic, person with cerebral palsy)		uncoordinated, hyperactive, messing something up. Can be used self-referentially. Has less offensive connotations in American usage.
spigot		a spile in a cask	a tap or faucet
spook		a ghost; a spy, government undercover agent (both orig. US)	a black person (insulting)
spotty	pimply ("a spotty teenager")		of inhomogeneous quality ("a spotty record")
sprouts (n.)	brussels sprouts		alfalfa sprouts
spunk	(vulgar) seminal fluid (US: cum)	courage, daring, or enthusiasm	
squash (n.)	fruit cordial drink (squash (drink))	sport (squash (sport))*	vegetable (squash (plant))*(UK also gourd)
squat		(n.) premises occupied by squatters (v.) to occupy (as premises) illegally to bend deeply at the knees while resting on one's feet (n.) the act of squatting an exercise in weightlifting	(n.) nothing (slang; short for diddly-squat) (more at cop)
stabiliser (UK), stabilizer (US & UK)	(pl.) additional wheels to help learner cyclists (US: training wheels)	something that stabilises, as stabilizer (aircraft) or stabilizer (chemistry)	
stall	(pl.) front seats in a theatre (US: orchestra)	compartment for an animal in a barn a booth or counter (as in a marketplace) seat in a church's choir abrupt loss of lift of an airfoil due to excessive angle of attack	compartment containing a shower or toilet (UK: cubicle) a marked-off parking space enclosure for a locomotive in a roundhouse (box stall) compartment in a barn where an animal can move untethered (UK: loose box)
stand (v.)	to be a candidate in an election *(US: run)	to be vertical; to remain stationary; to buy (someone) (something)	
starter	first course of a meal *(US usu. appetizer); more s.v. entree	one that starts (as a device to start an engine)	transportation dispatcher or elevator (q.v.) dispatcher starting pitcher (baseball) the official who starts a track race.
stash	(v.) to quit, put an end to ("to stash it")	(v.) to store away [old criminals' slang revived in US]	(n.) a hiding place, or something (esp. drug or liquor) stored away*
staycation	travelling for pleasure within one's own country (US: domestic vacation)*		a holiday or vacation where the people return home each night (or most nights)*
stick	abuse, insult, or denigration ("to give stick")	a long, thin piece of wood	
stone	(pl. usu. stone) 14 pounds in weight (14 lb), normally used when specifying a person's weight ("My weight is twelve stone four", meaning 12 stone and 4 pounds; US "172 pounds")	a small rock	
stoop	A post or pillar, especially a gatepost. (Rare except in dialect).	forwards bend of the spine bringing the shoulders in front of the hips dive of a predatory bird towards its prey	raised porch or entrance veranda (orig. Dutch; esp. Northeast). Also refers to the external stairs leading up to a row house, "Sitting on the stoop."
store	place for storage of items not needed for immediate use*	large consumer retail establishment (as department store or superstore)	consumer retail establishment of any size (UK: shop), e.g. grocery store, hardware store, convenience store, dime store; hence storefront (UK: shopfront), storekeeper (UK: shopkeeper)
story		an account of events, usu. fictional but sometimes factual	a floor of a building (UK: storey)
stove	a hothouse or greenhouse for plants the grate of a fireplace	wood- or coal-burning room-heating appliance (but in AmE this usage almost always limited to historical contexts, e.g. "one-room schoolhouses usually had potbelly stoves for warmth.")	(or cookstove) appliance for cooking food *– compare range (UK usu. cooker) see also Franklin stove
straight away, straightaway	(usu. spaced) immediately, right away *		(solid) a straight (in a road, racecourse, etc.)
strike	a good solid shot, as in scoring a goal in soccer (Strike off) to remove a professional's license (e.g., for attorneys: US disbar) ("What do you call a priest who's been stricken off?" – Dick Francis)	to temporarily stop working (often as part of a union) knock down all pins in bowling to ignite a match	to miss, as to miss the ball with the bat in baseball, (strike three, three strikes) (colloq., from baseball) gone, fired, ejected; said of someone especially after they've been given three chances to improve their (presumably) bad behavior ("Strike three, he's out!")
stroke	slash symbol (/)	cerebrovascular accident stroke (rowing), various meanings in the sport of rowing stroke play, a scoring system used in golf swimming stroke, a swimming style a scuba diver not following the rules of Doing It Right stroke (engine), a single action of some engines the recognition, attention or responsiveness that one person gives another in transactional analysis	
student		person studying at a post-secondary educational institution	person studying at any educational institution *
stuff (v)	to have sex – often used as a milder form of "fuck", e.g. "Get stuffed!" *(for "Fuck off!"), "Our team got stuffed in the match", etc.	to pack tightly with, especially with food: "I'm stuffed"="I've eaten too much".	
sub	to subsidise (pay for something in place of someone else – often used for any sort of informal loan) (in newspaper publishing) edit copy for length or house style (in full: sub-edit) subscription (UK: membership dues, as in an association or club) sub-lieutenant (Royal Navy rank) subaltern (British Army second lieutenant or lieutenant)	subscription: a purchase by prepayment for a certain number of issues, as of a periodical submarine (n. & v.) substitute (usu. in sport) (sexual) submissive	substitute teacher (UK: supply teacher) to teach in place of the normal teacher (regional) submarine sandwich*
subdivision		the process or an instance of subdividing	the division of a tract of land into lots (q.v.) for the purpose of sale, or the tract of land so divided. (UK: estate, development)
subway	pedestrian underpass Glasgow subterranean railway	(Subway) restaurant chain for submarine sandwiches	underground rapid transit (UK: underground or tube)
suck		to draw something by suction	to be of poor quality, objectionable, very bad (informal)
sucker		One who sucks (lit. and fig.): fool, dupe, gullible person Secondary shoot produced from the roots of a plant	A lollipop any person or thing (used either humorously or in annoyance)
suds		(n.) froth, lather; (v.) to lather	(v.) to form suds; hence sudser (a soap opera) and adj. sudsy (in both lit. & fig. senses) (n.) beer, less commonly root beer
superintendent	senior police rank (US approx.: deputy inspector)	senior official in various undertakings (railways, public works, etc.)	person in charge of a building (UK: caretaker) the head of a school district or a State Department of Education sometimes, the head of a police department (dated) a train conductor
surgery	the place where a physician or dentist practises (US: (doctor's) office); the period of time in which they are available for consultation; a period of time in which a politician is available to constituents, for consultation	act of performing a medical operation	
suspenders	elasticated support for stockings (US: garter)		elasticated support for trousers (UK: braces, q.v.)
swede	Swedish (yellow) turnip (US: rutabaga)	(Swede) a person from Sweden	
sweet	(n.) An after-meal dessert, more s.v. candy	(adj.) Sweet-tasting; (adj.) to describe someone who is kind, gentle, or giving	(n.) Short for sweetheart. Also, to be sweet on someone is to have a crush on them. (adj.) used to describe something as good ("That car is sweet!")
switch		(n.) see switch, telephone switch, network switch (v.) to operate a switch to exchange, swap, make a shift	(n.) mechanism that allows a railway vehicle to change tracks (UK: points); hence switch engine or switcher (UK: shunter), switchyard (UK: marshalling yard), switch tower (UK: signal box) (v.) to change tracks by means of a switch see also bait and switch
switchback	a road or railway that alternately ascends and descends a roller coaster		a zigzagging road or railway, usu. in the mountains; also, a hairpin turn in a road or trail

== T ==
Word	British English meanings	Meanings common to British and American English	American English meanings
tab	a cigarette (Geordie) to run; often used in the military to refer to double-time or quick-time marching. From the abbreviation Tactical Advance to Battle.	a small projection, flap, etc. an informal credit account, usu. at a bar ("Put it on my tab"); The tab key, &#09;	a formal account for services at a restaurant or bar ("May I have the tab?", "Pick up the tab") (UK always bill in this context); A brand of soft drink (keep tabs on) monitor the activity of a person or thing
table (verb) (as it relates to a topic for discussion)	(also lay [a topic] on the table or to make [a topic] lie on the table) to raise for consideration, to schedule for consideration, sometimes after a delay of "lying on the table"	Both dialects have the expression "to table [a topic]" as a short way of saying to lay [a topic] on the table and to make [a topic] lie on the table, but these have opposite meanings in these two dialects. The difference is due to how long the topic is thought to stay on the table. The British meaning is based on the idea that the topic will be on the table for only a short time and is there for the purpose of being discussed and voted on; the American meaning is based on the idea of leaving the topic on the table indefinitely and thereby disposing of it, i.e. killing its discussion.	(also lay [a topic] on the table or to make [a topic] lie on the table) to suspend from consideration, to shelve (in Congress, the meaning of "to table a bill" is to kill it), to postpone indefinitely or postpone to a certain time (usually intended as one of those two motions in Robert's Rules of Order)
taffy	(capitalised) derogatory term for a Welsh person		a type of sweet or candy (UK: chew)
tailback	queue of vehicles, traffic jam (US: gridlock, backup)		offensive backfield position in American football
tank top	jumper (US: sweater) without sleeves		sleeveless T-shirt (UK: vest, q.v.) (also see wifebeater) *
tanner	slang for a pre-decimalisation sixpence coin or sixpence value	one who tans	
tap	valve through which liquid is drawn and dispensed *(US usu.: faucet, spigot) (tap up) to covertly enter negotiations ("The manager accused the other team of tapping up his player") (US: tampering)	a spile or spigot in a cask; a device for dispensing beer from a keg (phone tap) a device for listening to other people's telephone calls (tap dance) A type of dance e.g. "I go to tap every Saturday"	to select, designate; esp. to publicly select for a special honour from one's peers as in the (possibly apocryphal) American Indian ceremony ("She was tapped for the position of CEO") and as in being designated a college fraternity pledge. vulgar slang for "have sex with" (object usually "that"; e.g. "I'd tap that")
tart	female prostitute (In US, generally understood but not generally used except in pop tart [overly sexualised female singer])	(adj) sour-flavoured, sarcastic (n) any of several forms of sweet dessert or snack consisting of filling (usually fruit) in a pastry shell saucy, promiscuous woman (derog.)	
tea	afternoon snack (US: late lunch) evening meal (sometimes called high tea)	a hot beverage made by infusing Camellia sinensis leaves (hot tea); Herb tea a tea-like beverage made from herbs (UK infusion (archaic))	Iced tea sometimes taken with lemon or sugar
on the telephone	having a working telephone (now rare, since most people do)	talking on the telephone	
teller		one that tells (as stories) a person who counts the votes in an election	a bank clerk or cashier who receives and pays out money *; hence automated teller machine
terrace	row of identical or mirror-image houses sharing side walls *(US: row house, townhouse)	a type of veranda or walkway or area close to a building see also terrace (agriculture), terrace garden, fluvial terrace	(regional) parking (q.v.)
terrier	member of the Territorial Army (slang). Also, record of land ownership (e.g. by local authority).	one of various smallish breeds of dog	
theatre (UK & US), theater (US)	(or operating theatre) hospital room for surgical operations (US: operating room)	a place where stage plays are performed; the dramatic art in general ("He got his training in theatre.") a principal region of conflict in a war	cinema ("movie/motion picture theater")
tick	the symbol ✓ (US: check mark) a moment ("just a tick") credit ("on tick")	blood-sucking arachnid (see tick) sound of an analogue clock	
tick off	to admonish		to annoy to keep a record of tasks ("He ticked off a list of things that needed to be done beforehand.")
tie	a game between two teams e.g. Manchester won the tie against London	an article of clothing worn around the neck a game result in which neither player/team wins (also draw)	a horizontal member, which lies beneath, and binds together, the rails of a railroad (also crosstie) (UK: sleeper)
tights	nylons, usu. sheer, which also cover the groin (US: pantyhose if sheer)		skin-tight, often opaque, trousers (UK: leggings) or one-piece trousers and top (UK: unitard), such as worn by gymnasts
tip	(n.) a place where rubbish is disposed (US: dump (also UK), landfill) (v.) to pour	(n.) pointed or narrow end advice voluntary gratuity paid (as at a restaurant) (v.) (tip off) to advise (v.) to (cause to) lean to one side	(tip one's hand, from Poker) to disclose one's intentions or opinions
tit	various species of small bird of the genus Parus (US: chickadee, titmouse) idiot (slang)	woman's breast (vulgar slang)	
toasted (v)		lightly cooked on both sides (e.g. of a slice of bread)	somewhat drunk or intoxicated by drugs (related toast) in trouble ("When the boss catches him, he's toast!" "Oh man, we're toast!")
toilet	room containing a toilet (US: restroom) "I left my comb in the toilet," is perfectly acceptable in UK but likely to provoke a visual in American English	apparatus for excretion	
tom	prostitute -- hence tomming (pp.), the activity of prostitution a private in the Parachute Regiment (slang)	unneutered male cat	(US regional) a male turkey.
torch	handheld device that emits light (US: flashlight)	flaming club used as a light source	(v.) commit an act of arson. (n.) an arsonist.
tosser	idiot *(literally, someone who masturbates, a derogatory term similar to wanker)	one that tosses	not a hoarder; someone who gets rid of things i.e. "are you a keeper or tosser?"
tough (interj.)		I don't care	that's unfortunate (short for "tough luck")
tout	(v.) to resell tickets at higher prices (US: scalp) to get and sell information on racehorses (n.) one who resells tickets (US: scalper) one who gets and sells information on racehorses (n.) a police informer (mainly used in Northern Ireland and the Republic of Ireland) (US: stool pigeon, England: grass)	(v.) to importune, solicit, or canvass (n.) one who does this [the n. appears to be in more general use in UK; cf. s.v. US solicitor]	(v.) to promote, recommend ("the movie was touted as a masterpiece")
tower, tower block	a fortified keep, too small to be named a "castle", e.g. along the English/Scottish Border ("a peel tower"), along the English coast & elsewhere (inc. occas. U.S. Eastern Seaboard) ("a Martello tower"), around the Jersey (Channel Islands) coast ("a Jersey tower"); tower block — a high-rise block (q.v.) of flats	artificial structure, taller than it is wide (see control tower, watchtower, water tower)	power line transmission structure (UK usu. & US occas. pylon, q.v.); railroad building containing levers for working switches (q.v.) and signals ("an interlocking tower") (UK: signal box) hence towerman, person in charge of any such tower (UK, for a signal box: signalman)
townhouse, town house	historically, residence of a peer or member of the aristocracy in the capital or major city (Scots) town hall (modern usage) a fashionable urban house, usu. terraced	a house in town (as opposed to one in the country)	one of two or more houses or apartments of uniform design and joined by common sidewalls *(US also rowhouse, UK usu. terraced house for more than two, or semi(-detached) for two joined houses)
township	in the past, a subdivision used to administer a large parish (Scotland) a very small agricultural community		an approx. 36-square-mile (93 km^{2}) division of land comprising 36 sections a unit of local government, see civil township
track		a trail a footprint awareness ("keep/lose track") recorded material distance between wheels of a vehicle a racetrack or racecourse the rails of a railway (UK often: line)	used in railway stations (as with following number) to denote the place where a train arrives at and departs from ("Is that the Chattanooga choo choo, track 29?") (UK: platform) track and field, athletics, esp. the sports performed on the running track categorisation of students according to their needs
trainer	a padded sport shoe (US similar: sneaker)	one who trains	
tram	a rail vehicle that runs on public streets (US: streetcar, trolley)		a rubber-tired trackless train an aerial tramway/cableway
tramp		homeless person who moves (tramps) from town to town (US also: hobo)	loose or promiscuous woman (see also tramp stamp); prostitute *
transit	generic name for a full size panel van, based on the Ford vehicle of the same name, which in Britain dominates the market for such vehicles.	act or instance of passing see astronomical transit, navigational transit, transit (surveying)	means of public transportation (q.v.) (esp. of people) ("mass transit", "rapid transit", "public transit") – see Public transport
transport	the system or the business of transporting goods or passengers or the vehicles used in such a system ("public transport") *	the act of transporting an emotion ("transports of delight")	
transportation		the act of transporting penal transportation one's means of transportation (i.e. vehicle(s))	the system or the business of transporting goods or passengers or the vehicles used in such a system *
trapezium	a quadrilateral with one pair of parallel sides		a quadrilateral with no parallel sides
trapezoid	a quadrilateral with no parallel sides	in anatomy, the trapezoid bone and trapezoid ligament	a quadrilateral with one pair of parallel sides *
treacle	molasses	cloying, overly sentimental	
treble	(v.) to multiply or increase by three times (US: triple) (adj.) three times bigger or greater * (n.) a set of three successive victories in sports or athletic competitions, esp. in football and rugby league a type of bet involving three selections	(n.) higher range of sounds for an instrument, in music, or on the radio a child's high singing voice (US: usually soprano esp. for girls); a child with, or a musical piece for, that voice a high-pitched instrument the smallest, highest-pitched bell in a set (adj.) has three parts; threefold	
triangle		any three-sided figure	a triangular object used in technical drawing (UK: set square)
trick		(n.) an action intended to deceive an effective way of doing something a single round of some card games, in which every player plays one card	(n.) what a prostitute does for a client (adj.) unstable (of a joint of the body) * (v.) turning tricks: soliciting a client for prostitution
trillion	(traditionally) million million million (10^{18}) (US & modern UK: quintillion)	million million (10^{12}) (traditional UK: billion, now rare)	
trim (n.)		good condition ("in trim") clothing, decoration a finishing haircut adjustment (as of sails on a vessel or airfoils on an aircraft) an automobile interior ornamentation or upholstery (orig. US)	woodwork, frameworks etc. in a house storefront or shopfront display (slang, somewhat offensive) Female genitalia (usu. as "Get some trim")
triplex		composed of three parts, as a type of cardboard, a cinema, etc.	a 3-storey apartment or 3-apartment dwelling (see duplex) a large steam locomotive with three sets of driving wheels
trolley	cart or wheeled stand used for conveying something (as food or books) ("a supermarket trolley"; "a tea trolley") (US: see s.v. cart, wagon) (off one's trolley) insane (trolleyed) very drunk	a mechanism that rolls along a suspended rail or track	(or trolley car) a streetcar (UK: tram) electrically powered by means of a trolley; hence trolley line, trolley road, and trackless trolley (a trolleybus)
troop	to carry (the flag or colours) in a ceremonial way before troops	a group of persons, particularly in a military or scouting context. Generally, a group of two or more platoons and headquarters staff. (pl.) soldiers, members of the military (we sent 3000 troops)	
trooper	cavalry horse troopship (obs.) rank held by a private in the Household Cavalry, Royal Armoured Corps or SAS		state police officer ("state trooper") (slang) a heroic person that prevails against the odds or takes on a difficult labor without complaint (originally 'trouper')
truck	railway vehicle for carrying goods; can be open ("a coal truck") or covered ("a cattle truck") – cf. s.v. wagon	any of various vehicles for carrying esp. things or animals, as a forklift truck or a pickup truck metal part of a skateboard which connects the wheels to the deck and acts as an axle. See: skateboard § trucks	motor vehicle for carrying heavy cargo *(UK usu. lorry); see also garbage truck (UK: dustcart), truck stop (UK: transport cafe) produce grown for the market; hence truck farm (UK: market garden) a hand truck (UK: trolley) in a railroad car, the undercarriage assembly incorporating wheels, suspension, and brakes (UK: bogie) (v.) to transport by or drive a truck; to move around carelessly
trunk	primary road (trunk road) (trunk call) long-distance telephone call (dated)	the human torso the main stem of a tree large (person-sized) container (also travelling chest) proboscis, particularly that of an elephant	storage compartment of a car (UK: boot) (trunk line) a main railway line (as from Chicago to New York City) (UK: main line)
tube	(often cap.) the London subterranean railway system ("the London Underground"); (sometimes incorrectly applied to that of other cities, e.g. "the Berlin tube")	a cylindrical structure or device	television
turnout	strike, walkout	number of people taking part in an event ("voter turnout") a railroad switch or point equipment output	a place along a highway for slower cars to pull over, in order to let others pass, or for brief parking (UK: layby)
twat	someone who is being stupid *(offensive; considered vulgar by some) to hit someone or something hard ("say that again and I'll twat you!" (pronounced /ˈtwæt/)	vulva (vulgar) (pronounced /ˈtwɒt/)	A vulgar or derogatory term for a woman.
twister		something that twists; see also Twister (game)	a tornado
tyke	someone from Yorkshire (informal, sometimes disparaging)	term of endearment for a child, like "little rascal"	a young animal

== U ==
Word	British English meanings	Meanings common to British and American English	American English meanings
undercoat	coat of paint applied prior to the top coat (US: primer)	layer of fine hair close to the skin of a mammal	rustproofing treatment applied to the underneath of an automobile (UK: underseal)
underground	(often cap.) subterranean railway system, esp. the ones in London & Glasgow (US: subway or metro) -- see also tube	subterranean illicit a subterranean space or channel grapevine (in the sense of an informal communication network)	(Underground Railroad or Railway) (before 1863) the network of clandestine routes by which slaves were helped to escape to free states and Canada. More generally, any secret resistance organization,* as in Weather Underground and French underground.
us	oblique form of I (i.e. alternative to "me") (informal), esp. in the North of England ("lend us a tenner")	oblique form of we ("he saw us")	

== V ==
Word	British English meanings	Meanings common to British and American English	American English meanings
vacation	(UK also: vac)	period between university terms	(n.) time off from work or school recreational trip away from home (UK: holiday for both senses) (v.) to take a vacation (n., especially NCAA usage) vacated victory; forfeiture of sports competition results and/or records by an institution; an act or instance of vacating or legally voiding them
valve	Vacuum tube, as in pre-1960 electronics	a device to control the flow of liquids or gases	
vanity		pride in one's appearance	a sink-unit in a bathroom
vest	garment, usu. sleeveless, worn under a shirt (US: undershirt or beater) sleeveless garment worn as an only visible top		sleeveless garment worn over a shirt (UK: waistcoat) (e.g. ballistic vest *)
vet		(n.) veterinarian (v.) to appraise or verify for accuracy or validity	war veteran or a person who has served honorably in the military
veterinary	(n.) veterinarian	(a.) pertaining to the medical science of caring of animals	
vine	grapevine		any climbing or twining plant (UK "climber")
visit (v.)		(trans.) to go and see (a person or place)	(intrans.) to pay a visit, stay as a guest, or be engaged in informal conversation ("visiting together", "visit with a friend")

== W ==
Word	British English meanings	Meanings common to British and American English	American English meanings
waffle	(v.) to speak to no purpose; ramble	A type of pancake with a pattern of square dents in it, made in a waffle iron.	(v.) to equivocate, waver, speak evasively
wagon	railway vehicle for transporting goods (US: freight car)	4-wheeled orig. animal-drawn vehicle (UK also spelled waggon esp. in the past); state of abstaining from alcohol (orig. US slang) a delivery van ("the milk wagon")	small wheeled food service table (UK: trolley); see also paddy wagon (used in the UK, but non PC), station wagon, chuckwagon, wagon train
walk out, walkout	(v.) "walk out with", to be romantically involved with (archaic)	(v.) to leave a meeting in protest to strike (orig. US) to abandon someone, or to drop out ("she walked out on me") (orig. US) (n.) a kind of strike action (orig. US) the act of leaving a meeting in protest	(adj.) (of a room in a building) featuring outdoor access; (n.) such an access ("full walkout basement", "walkout to the deck") (n.) one who goes out of a store or shop without buying anything
walking stick		(n.) a stick to aid with walking	(n.) a type of insect (UK : stick insect)
warden	any of various officials *(a "traffic warden") an official in certain universities	gener., one in charge of something	official in charge of a prison *(UK usu. governor) in compounds: fire warden
wash up	to wash the dishes; to clean after eating food, hence washing-up liquid (US dish soap)		to wash one's hands and face; to clean before eating food
watershed	(orig. sense, now nontech.) a ridge of hills (which "sheds water") separating two river drainage basins; water parting *(old-fashioned or nontechnical in US; US usu. divide) the time of day before which programme content of an adult nature, or of a specific or implied kind, may not be screened and after which it is permissible (US: safe harbor)	(fig.) a turning point	a drainage basin/water catchment area (shift from orig. sense) *
well	really (colloquial, used for emphasis) ("that was well funny")	adverb of good healthy, in good form pit sunk to obtain water or oil	
wicked	(interjection) used for something very good, astounding or interesting ("Wicked!")*	(adj.) evil; fierce; roguish; vile	(adverb) very (esp. New England) ("Wicked good")
wifebeater, wife-beater	(slang) the beer Stella Artois (perh. also related to "A Streetcar Named Desire")	(wife beater) one who beats up his wife	a sleeveless shirt (such as that worn by Marlon Brando in "A Streetcar Named Desire") *(also Scotland)
wing (vehicles)	panel of a car that encloses the wheel area (US: fender)	apparatus used to create lift in aeronautics a type of spoiler (on racecars) the act of carrying out an activity with little or no planning, To wing something, "Let's wing it!" (slang)	
wing commander	air force officer rank (US equivalent: lieutenant colonel)		a duty title for an air force officer, typically a full colonel or a brigadier general, who commands a wing (Note American wings are larger formations than British wings)
wingnut	(n.) derogatory term for a person with prominent, sticking out, ears	(n.) a nut with projections to allow application of greater torque with the fingers a type of tree	(n.) (mild) a crazy or strange person Wingnut (politics), an uncomplimentary term for someone of right-wing or conservative views
wink	(n.) "winker", slang term for a turn indicator (US: see blinker)	(n. & v.) the closing of one eye	
wrangle (v.)		to bicker or quarrel angrily and noisily	(esp. West) to herd horses or other livestock; back-formation from wrangler to achieve through contrivance; to wangle
wreck (n.)		shipwreck that which remains of something wrecked someone who is unwell or out of sorts (e.g. "nervous wreck")	a usu. major road, rail, or air accident or collision
wrench		a sudden pull or twist emotional distress	a tool used for tightening nuts and bolts *(used in UK chiefly in combination, e.g. torque wrench) something disrupting (often monkey wrench) ("that will throw a monkey wrench into my plans") (UK usu. spanner for both senses)

== X ==
Word	British English meanings	Meanings common to British and American English	American English meanings
xerox		the Xerox Corporation	(n.) A photocopied document * (v.) To photocopy *

== Y ==
Word	British English meanings	Meanings common to British and American English	American English meanings
yankee, yank	Someone from anywhere in the US. Also an adjective (sometimes disparaging, esp. when shortened to yank)	someone from the U.S.	(n.)1. A patriot from the American Revolution; 2. a New Englander; in the South, someone from the Northern US (often disparaging). A Minnesotan would not consider himself a Yankee or use the word regularly, but would consider someone from Connecticut to be a yankee; a Texan would consider both yankees, but not himself, and would be much more likely to use the word; 3. a player for the New York Yankees baseball team
yard		a courtyard an enclosed space used for a particular activity (as a railway service area, a lumberyard or timber yard, a junkyard, etc.) a unit of length	enclosed area of land surrounding a dwelling, usu. comprising lawn and play area (UK usu.: garden) (yard sale) see garage sale a campus (e.g. Harvard Yard) a place (as in a forest) where deer gather in winter 100 dollars (slang) a billion (slang, finance) go yard, to hit a home run

== Z ==
Word	British English meanings	Meanings common to British and American English	American English meanings
z	(pronounced /ˈzɛd/)	the last letter of the alphabet	(pronounced /ˈziː/) a nap ("to catch some z's") zero or no ("I have z cash right now.")
zebra	(zebra crossing) a type of pedestrian crossing (pronounced /ˈzɛbrə/) *	an African equine mammal	a referee (as in American football) (from their striped uniforms) (pronounced /ˈziːbrə/) police car (slang)
zip	(short for zip fastener) a fastening device (US: zipper)	a sharp, hissing sound impetus file format for compressed files ("archive.zip")	zero (often in scores, similar to the UK's nil) (often all cap.) the ZIP code (from Zone Improvement Plan), the postal code used by the USPS

== See also ==
- List of words having different meanings in British and American English: A–L
- List of American words not widely used in the United Kingdom
- List of British words not widely used in the United States
