= Cacls =

Microsoft Windows and ReactOS native command line utility

In Microsoft Windows, cacls, and its replacement icacls, are native command-line utilities that can display and modify the security descriptors on files and folders. An access-control list is a list of permissions for securable object, such as a file or folder, that controls who can access it. The cacls command is also available on ReactOS.

== cacls ==
cacls
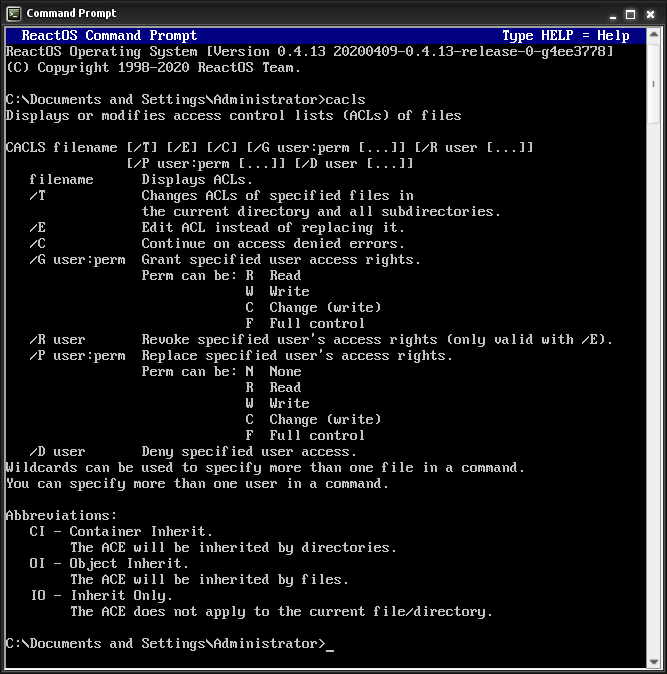
- The ReactOS cacls command
- Developers: Microsoft, Thomas Weidenmueller
- Release: 1994, 31–32 years ago
- Operating system: Microsoft Windows, ReactOS
- Type: Command
- License: Windows: Proprietary commercial software ReactOS: GNU Lesser General Public License
- Website: docs.microsoft.com/en-us/windows-server/administration/windows-commands/cacls

The cacls.exe utility is a deprecated command line editor of directory and file security descriptors in Windows NT 3.5 and later operating systems of the Windows NT family. Microsoft has produced the following newer utilities, some also subsequently deprecated, that offer enhancements to support changes introduced with version 3.0 of the NTFS filesystem:

- xcacls.exe is supported by Windows 2000 and later and adds new features like setting Execute, Delete and Take Ownership permissions
- xcacls.vbs
- fileacl.exe
- icacls.exe (included in Windows Server 2003 SP2 and later)
- SubInAcl.exe - Resource Kit utility to set and replace permissions on various type of objects including files, services and registry keys
- Windows PowerShell (Get-Acl and Set-Acl cmdlets)

The ReactOS version was developed by Thomas Weidenmueller and is licensed under the GNU Lesser General Public License.

== icacls ==
icacls
- Developer: Microsoft
- Release: 2007, 18–19 years ago
- Operating system: Microsoft Windows
- Type: Command
- License: Proprietary commercial software
- Website: docs.microsoft.com/en-us/windows-server/administration/windows-commands/icacls

Stands for Integrity Control Access Control List. Windows Server 2003 Service Pack 2 and later include icacls, an in-box command-line utility that can display, modify, backup and restore ACLs for files and folders, as well as to set integrity levels and ownership in Vista and later versions. It is not a complete replacement for cacls, however. For example, it does not support Security Descriptor Definition Language (SDDL) syntax directly via command line parameters (only via the /restore option).

== See also ==
- SetACL
- chmod
- takeown
