= Lugnut =

Lugnut or lug nut may refer to:

- Lug nut, a fastener that secures a wheel to a vehicle
- Lugnut (Transformers), a Decepticon from Transformers: Animated
- Lugnutz, a Decepticon from Transformers: Cybertron
- Lansing Lugnuts, a baseball team

== See also ==
- Longnut, an extinct species of freshwater mussel
- Wingnut (disambiguation)
