= The Sunday Mail =

Sunday Mail or The Sunday Mail may refer to:

== Newspapers ==
- Sunday Mail (Scotland), Scottish tabloid
- The Sunday Mail (Brisbane), Sunday tabloid in Queensland, Australia
- The Mail on Sunday, British conservative tabloid
- Sunday Mail (Adelaide), Sunday tabloid in Adelaide, South Australia
- Sunday Mail, Sunday edition of The Malay Mail; now replaced by Weekend Mail
- The Sunday Mail (Zimbabwe), Sunday paper in Harare, Zimbabwe, sister paper to The Herald

== Music ==
- "Sunday Mail", a song by Marcy Playground from their 1999 album Shapeshifter
- The Sunday Mail, former name of the band Jukebox the Ghost

== See also ==
- Mail on Sunday (album), 2008 album by Flo Rida
- Sunday (disambiguation)
- Mail (disambiguation)
