= User Interface Privilege Isolation =

Security technology in Microsoft Windows

User Interface Privilege Isolation (UIPI) is a technology introduced in Windows Vista and Windows Server 2008 to combat shatter attack exploits. By making use of Mandatory Integrity Control, it prevents processes with a lower "integrity level" (IL) from sending messages to higher IL processes (except for a very specific set of UI messages).

Window messages are designed to communicate user action to processes. However, they can be used to run arbitrary code in the receiving process' context. This could be used by a malicious low-privilege processes to run arbitrary code in the context of a higher-privilege process, which constitutes an unauthorized privilege escalation. By restricting the ability of lower-privileged processes to send window messages to higher-privileged processes, UIPI can mitigate these kinds of attacks.

UIPI, and Mandatory Integrity Control more generally, is a security feature but not a security boundary.

Microsoft Office 2010 uses UIPI for its Protected View sandbox to prohibit potentially unsafe documents from modifying components, files, and other resources on a system.
