= Moonbat =

American pejorative political epithet

"Moonbat" is a pejorative political epithet used in United States politics, referring to liberals, progressives, or leftists (especially the far-left).

== Etymology ==
Descriptions of bat-like people on the Moon were part of the 1835 Great Moon hoax.

A long poem, The Proving of Gennad: A Mythological Romance by Landred Lewis (1890), uses the term "moonbat" to refer to unsound ideas, but not specifically political ones.

"Moonbat" was the name for the XP-67 experimental aircraft, developed by McDonnell Aircraft Corporation for the U.S. Army Air Corps in 1941. The term was later used by science fiction author Robert A. Heinlein in the 1947 short story "Space Jockey" as the name of a rocket spacecraft used for the third step of a journey from the Earth to the Moon.

== Examples of usage ==
- Columnist and radio talk show host Howie Carr has used the term a number of times in his column in the Boston Herald. On the radio he frequently uses the term as a pejorative toward those holding left-wing political beliefs. In 2008, Carr wrote about the number of "Moonbats" inhabiting the town of Arlington, Massachusetts. In response, a group of Arlington residents founded the Menotomy Moonbats to raise money for their local public schools: Menotomy was the historical name for Arlington during the American Revolutionary War.
- On March 14, 2000 Jonah Goldberg's National Review Online column "Our, *ahem*, FAQ Welcome New Readers" contained the following: "Alas, because Goldberg watches Baywatch everyday and can name the main characters in almost every Marvel comic book from 1976 to 1986, he occasionally makes errors. Far more often, he simply writes things that make readers say, 'Is this guy higher than a moonbat?'"
- Margery Eagan, another Herald columnist, used the term several times in 2006 and 2007 to characterize some supporters of former Massachusetts Democratic governor Deval Patrick.
- Columnist and blogger Michelle Malkin was quoted in March 2006 by Howard Kurtz as writing, "But now the determined moonbat hordes have exposed multiple instances of what clearly appear to me to be blatant lifting of entire, unique passages by [blogger] Ben Domenech from other writers," in reference to Domenech's resignation from the Washington Post after evidence of his plagiarism came to light.
- In 2026, conservative Texas U.S. Senator Ted Cruz said a win for progressive Michigan U.S. Senate candidate Abdul El-Sayed would pave the way for a Alexandria Ocasio-Cortez presidency: “If El-Sayed wins, they’ll say, 'nope, you could nominate a moonbat and a swing-state will vote for her.'"
- The term has been used in the UK to refer to George Monbiot, owing to its similarity with his surname, and referring to his left-wing views.
- "Moonbat" is the name of Conservative Jones' sidekick, a recurring character in Tom Tomorrow's political cartoon This Modern World.

== See also ==
- Antifa (United States)
- Loony left
- McDonnell XP-67 "Bat", also called the Moonbat
- Nanny state
- Neocon
- Neoliberalism
- Sheeple
- Wingnut
