= Security descriptor =

Security descriptors are data structures of security information for securable Windows objects, that is objects that can be identified by a unique name. Security descriptors can be associated with any named objects, including files, folders, shares, registry keys, processes, threads, named pipes, services, job objects and other resources.

Security descriptors contain discretionary access control lists (DACLs) that contain access control entries (ACEs) that grant and deny access to trustees such as users or groups. They also contain a system access control list (SACLs) that control auditing of object access. ACEs may be explicitly applied to an object or inherited from a parent object. The order of ACEs in an ACL is important, with access denied ACEs appearing higher in the order than ACEs that grant access. Security descriptors also contain the object owner.

Mandatory Integrity Control is implemented through a new type of ACE on a security descriptor.

Files and folder permissions can be edited by various tools including Windows Explorer, WMI, command line tools like Cacls, XCacls, ICacls, SubInACL, the freeware Win32 console FILEACL, the free software utility SetACL, and other utilities. To edit a security descriptor, a user needs WRITE_DAC permissions to the object, a permission that is usually delegated by default to administrators and the object's owner.

== Permissions in NTFS ==
The following table summarizes NTFS permissions and their roles (in individual rows.) The table exposes the following information:

- Permission code: Each access control entry (ACE) specifies its permissions with an numerical code. There are 14 codes (12 in older systems) which can be accumulated.
- Meaning: Each permission code has a meaning, depending on whether it is applied to a file or a folder. For example, code 0x01 on a file indicates the permission to read the file, while on a folder indicates the permission to list the content of the folder. Knowing the meaning alone, however, is useless. An ACE must also specify to whom the permission applies, and whether that permission is granted or denied.
- Included in: In addition to individual permissions, an ACE can specify special permissions known as "generic access rights." These special permissions are equivalents of a number individual permissions. For example, GENERIC_READ (or GR) is the equivalent of "Read data", "Read attributes", "Read extended attributes", "Read permissions", and "Synchronize". Because it makes sense to ask for these five at the same time, requesting "GENERIC_READ" is more convenient.
- Alias: The Security Descriptor Definition Language and the Windows command-line utilities (icacls and cacls) have their own aliases for these permissions.

Permission code	Meaning		Included in					Alias		
Permission code	For files	For folders	R (Note: GENERIC_READ, known as "Read" in File Explorer)	E (Note: GENERIC_EXECUTE, known as "Read & Execute" in File Explorer)	W (Note: GENERIC_WRITE, known as "Write" in File Explorer)	A (Note: GENERIC_ALL, known as "Full Control" in File Explorer)	M (Note: Known as "Modify" in File Explorer)	In SDDL	In icacls	In cacls
0x01	Read data	List folder contents	Yes	Yes		Yes	Yes	CC	RD	FILE_READ_DATA
0x80	Read attributes		Yes	Yes		Yes	Yes	DC	RA	FILE_READ_ATTRIBUTES
0x08	Read extended attributes		Yes	Yes		Yes	Yes	SW	REA	FILE_READ_EA
0x20	Execute file	Traverse folder		Yes		Yes	Yes	WP	X	FILE_EXECUTE
0x20000	Read permissions		Yes	Yes	Yes	Yes	Yes	RC	RC	READ_CONTROL
0x100000	Synchronize		Yes	Yes	Yes	Yes	Yes		S	SYNCHRONIZE
0x02	Write data	Create files			Yes	Yes	Yes	DC	WD	FILE_WRITE_DATA
0x04	Append data	Create folders			Yes	Yes	Yes	LC	AD	FILE_APPEND_D
0x100	Write attributes				Yes	Yes	Yes	CR	WA	FILE_WRITE_ATTRIBUTES
0x10	Write extended attributes				Yes	Yes	Yes	RP	WEA	FILE_WRITE_EA
0x10000	Delete (or rename)					Yes	Yes	SD	DE	DELETE
0x40000	Change permissions					Yes		WD	WDAC	WRITE_DAC
0x80000	Take ownership					Yes		WO	WO	WRITE_OWNER
0x40	Delete subfolders and files					Yes		DT	DC	FILE_DELETE_CHILD

Most of these permissions are self-explanatory, except the following:

1. Renaming a file requires the "Delete" permission.
2. File Explorer doesn't show "Synchronize" and always sets it. Multi-threaded apps like File Explorer and Windows Command Prompt need the "Synchronize" permission to be able to work with files and folders.

== See also ==
- Access control § Computer security
- Information technology security audit
- Authorization
- Computer security
- Information security
- Token (Windows NT architecture)
- Windows SID
- SDDL
