= Mailbox (disambiguation) =

Mailbox may refer to:

== Mail ==
- Letter box (also known as a letter plate, letter hole, deed or mail slot), a private receptacle for incoming mail
- Post box (also known as a drop box), a public receptacle for outgoing mail
  - Pillar box, a freestanding post box in the United Kingdom and the Commonwealth
- Pigeon-hole messagebox, also known as a cubbyhole, pigeon-hole or pidge

== Computing ==
- Email box, a destination for electronic messages
- Mailbox (application), email management software for mobile devices
- Mbox, file formats
- Message queue, a means of interprocess communication in software engineering

== Other uses ==
- Mailbox Birmingham, a retail complex in Birmingham, England
- The Mailbox (film), a short movie by the Church of Jesus Christ of Latter-day Saints
- Mailbox, a square-centric method of addressing a game board in game playing computer automatons; see Board representation (computer chess)

== See also ==
- Mailbox baseball
- Mail (disambiguation)
- Box (disambiguation)
