= Squat =

Squat, squatter or squatting may refer to:

== Body position ==
- Squatting position, a sitting position where one's knees are folded with heels touching one's buttocks or back of the thighs
- Squat (exercise), a lower-body exercise in strength and conditioning

== Computing and the Internet ==
- Cybersquatting, refers to registering Internet domain names similar to popular trademarks with the intent to extort the trademark holder
- Squatting attack, a kind of computer attack

== Law and property ==
- Squatting, the occupation of abandoned or unused building without the permission of the owner
- Squatting (Australian history), historical Australian term referring to settlers occupying Crown land in order to graze livestock

== Media and entertainment ==
- Squat, a species of Flanimal from the More Flanimals and other books in the series
- Squat, the alternate name of the title character of Scott Adams' comic Plop: The Hairless Elbonian
- Squats (song), a 2015 song credited to Oh Snap! and Bombs Away
- Squatter (game), an Australian board game
- Squatters (film), a 2014 movie starring Richard Dreyfuss
- Squat (film), 2017 film directed by Samuel Matteau

== Science ==
- Squat effect, in hydrodynamics
- Bob and squat, the pitching motion of bicycle suspensions when under acceleration

== Other uses ==
- Squatter pigeon (Geophaps scripta), a species of bird
