= Nanny state =

Overprotective or interfering government

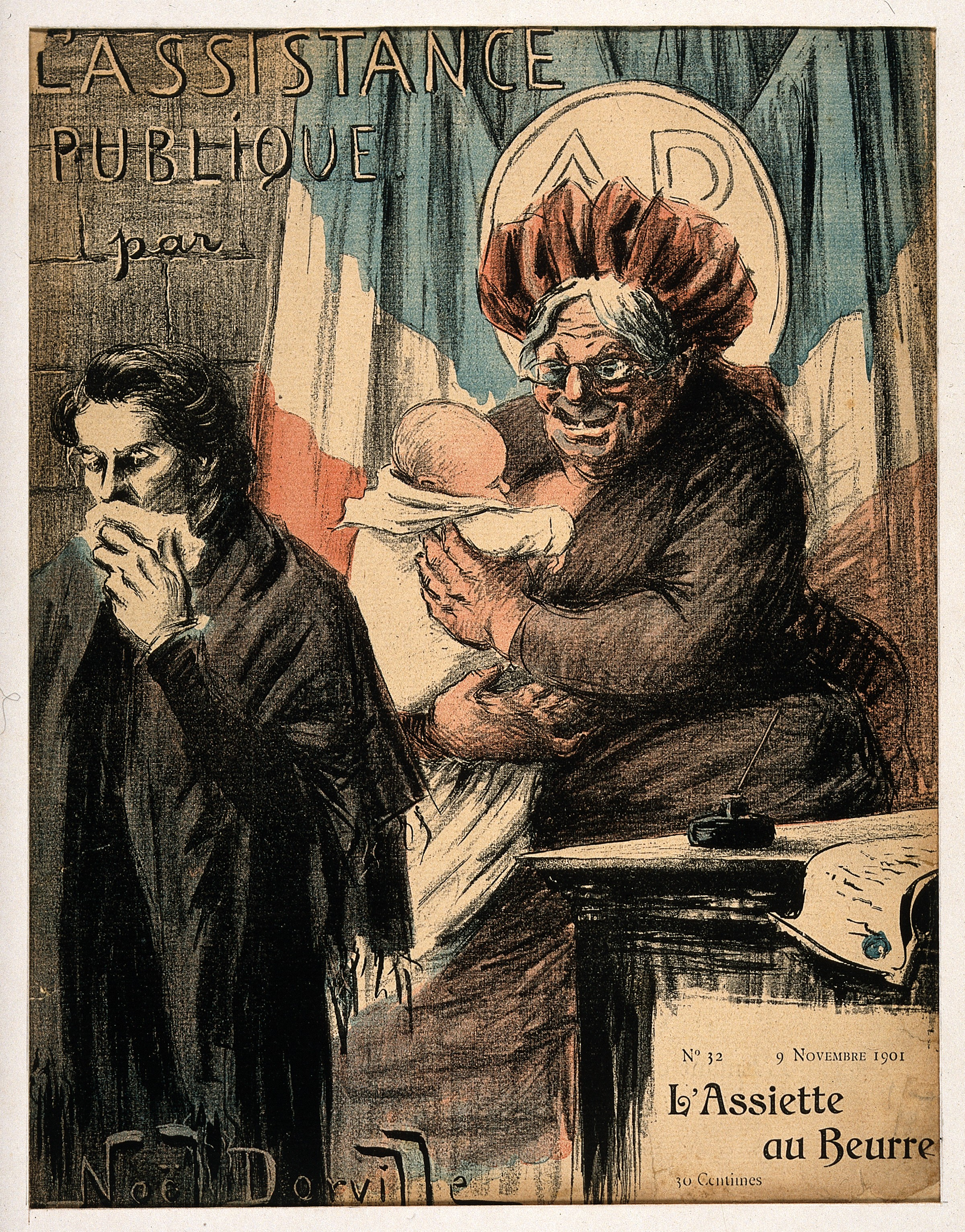
1901 cartoon mocking the French nanny state by depicting it as a wet nurse

Nanny state is a term of British origin that conveys a view that a government or its policies are overprotective or interfering unduly with personal choice. The term likens such a government to the role that a nanny has in child rearing. An early use of the term comes from the Conservative British Member of Parliament Iain Macleod, who referred to "what I like to call the nanny state" in the 3 December 1965 edition of The Spectator. The term was popularised by the journalists Bernard Levin and Auberon Waugh, and later by Prime Minister Margaret Thatcher.

== Uses of term ==
=== Australia ===
The term has been used to describe the policies of both federal and state governments. The Canadian journalist and magazine publisher Tyler Brûlé argued that Australian cities were becoming over-sanitised and the country was "on the verge of becoming the world's dumbest nation." This was blamed on the removal of personal responsibility and the increase in the number and scope of health and safety laws. Liberal Democrats senator David Leyonhjelm also used the term when launching an Australian Senate enquiry into laws and regulations that restrict personal choice "for the individual's own good". The term has also been used to criticise mandatory bicycle helmet laws, gun control laws, strict vehicle modification laws, prohibitions on alcohol in public places, plain packaging for cigarettes and pub/club lockout laws. Most states do not have separate laws or licenses for off-road vehicles and off-road areas (such as state forests or national parks). It is illegal to use any vehicle that doesn't meet highway laws (cargo trike, side-by-side, dirt bike, rock crawler, atv, utv) in public off-road areas, where police patrol and apply regular highway laws.

=== New Zealand ===
The term was used by the New Zealand National Party to describe the policies of their political opponents, the Fifth Labour Government, who were in power from 1999 until 2008. In turn, the child policies of the National Party's Paula Bennett were later given the 'nanny state' label by a Māori Community Law Service manager in 2012. In 2017, the Queenstown-Lakes District Council's proposed restrictions on residents renting their rooms on the short term rental site, Airbnb, prompted criticism by the company, which described the move as "nanny-state".

=== Singapore ===
The city-state of Singapore has a reputation as a nanny state, owing to the considerable number of government regulations and restrictions on its citizens' lives. Former Prime Minister Lee Kuan Yew, the architect of the modern Singapore, observed: "If Singapore is a nanny state, then I am proud to have fostered one." In an interview in the Straits Times in 1987, Lee said:

I am often accused of interfering in the private lives of citizens. Yes, if I did not, had I not done that, we wouldn’t be here today. And I say without the slightest remorse, that we wouldn’t be here, we would not have made economic progress, if we had not intervened on very personal matters–who your neighbour is, how you live, the noise you make, how you spit, or what language you use. We decide what is right. Never mind what the people think.

=== United Kingdom ===
In 1980, Lord Balfour of Inchrye strongly opposed the introduction of seatbelt legislation, saying it was "yet another state narrowing of individual freedom and individual responsibility". He worried that future intrusions of the "nanny state" would include restrictions on cigarettes and alcohol, and mandatory life jackets. In 2004, King's Fund, a think tank, conducted a survey of more than 1,000 people and found that most favoured policies that combatted behaviour such as eating a poor diet and public smoking; this was reported by the BBC as the public favouring a nanny state.

The British Labour Party politician Margaret Hodge has defended policies she acknowledged had been labelled as "nanny state", saying at a speech to the Institute for Public Policy Research on November 26, 2004, that "some may call it the nanny state but I call it a force for good". The "Soft Drinks Industry Levy", the UK's sugary drink tax proposed in 2016 and effective from 2018, was described by Member of Parliament Will Quince as "patronizing, regressive and the nanny state at its worst".

=== United States ===
By the 2000s, the term entered use in the United States by some political commentators. The term was used in an at-large sense against policies such as the banishment of smoking in public places or the enactment of mandatory bicycle helmet laws. In 2012, a proposal by New York City Mayor Michael Bloomberg to restrict the sale of soft drinks in venues, restaurants, and sidewalk carts to 16 ounces led to derision of the mayor as "Nanny Bloomberg". David Harsanyi has used the term to describe food labeling regulations, the legal drinking age, and socially conservative government policies. Conversely, Dean Baker of the Center for Economic and Policy Research think tank used the term in 2006 to describe conservative policies that protect the income of the rich.

=== China ===
In September 2021, the Washington Post editorial board decried "dictatorships" that "impose decisions about what people can see, hear and — to the extent the regimes can manage it — think". The board wrote that Xi Jinping, as General Secretary of the Chinese Communist Party and paramount leader, is "pushing the nanny state into people's personal lives" with regulations on online gaming among the country's teenagers, as well as other matters. The board added, "Not many [parents] want to cede parenting decisions to an authoritarian party-state."

== See also ==
- "Big government"
- Criticism of welfare
- Involuntary unemployment
- "Hamburger problem"
- Market intervention
- Managerial state
- Moonbat
- Paternalism
- Redwashing
- Totalitarianism
- Welfare state
