= Pump (disambiguation) =

A pump is a mechanical device used to move fluids or slurries.

Pump may also refer to:

== Arts, entertainment, and media ==
=== Music ===
- Lil Pump (born 2000), American rapper and songwriter
- Pump (album), Aerosmith album (1989)
- "The Pump", song by Quiet Riot from the QR III album
- Pump, a type of Caribbean drums

=== Other uses in arts, entertainment and media ===
- Pump (film), documentary film on petroleum-based fuel consumption (2014)

== Footwear ==
- Ballet pump or ballet flat, flat-soled ballet shoe
- Court shoe, or pump, heeled slip-on shoe with a low-cut front
- Ghillies (dance shoes), or pumps, soft, laced shoes worn by Scottish and Irish dancers
- Plimsoll shoe or pump, athletic shoe style
- Reebok Pump, athletic shoe line

== Science and technology ==
- Pump (constellation) or Antlia
- Pump action, a type of manual firearm action
- Breast pump, mechanical device that lactating women use to extract milk from their breasts
- Charge pump, a circuit design
- Heat pump, device that transfers heat energy from a source of heat to a heat sink
- Ion pump (biology), or ion transporter, transmembrane protein that moves ions across a biological membrane against their concentration gradient through active transport
- Ion pump (physics), or sputter ion pump, type of vacuum pump which operates by sputtering a metal getter
- Laser pumping, the act of energy transfer from an external source into the gain medium of a laser
- Muscle pump, term used in fitness describing a phenomenon after intense resistance training
- Skeletal-muscle pump, collection of skeletal muscles that aid the heart in the circulation of blood
- Vacuum pump, device that removes gas molecules from a sealed volume in order to leave behind a partial vacuum

== Other uses ==
- Pump (skateboarding), technique in skateboarding
- Pump (bottled water), brand of bottled spring water available in Australia and New Zealand

== See also ==
- Pumping (disambiguation)
