= Loony left =

British pejorative term

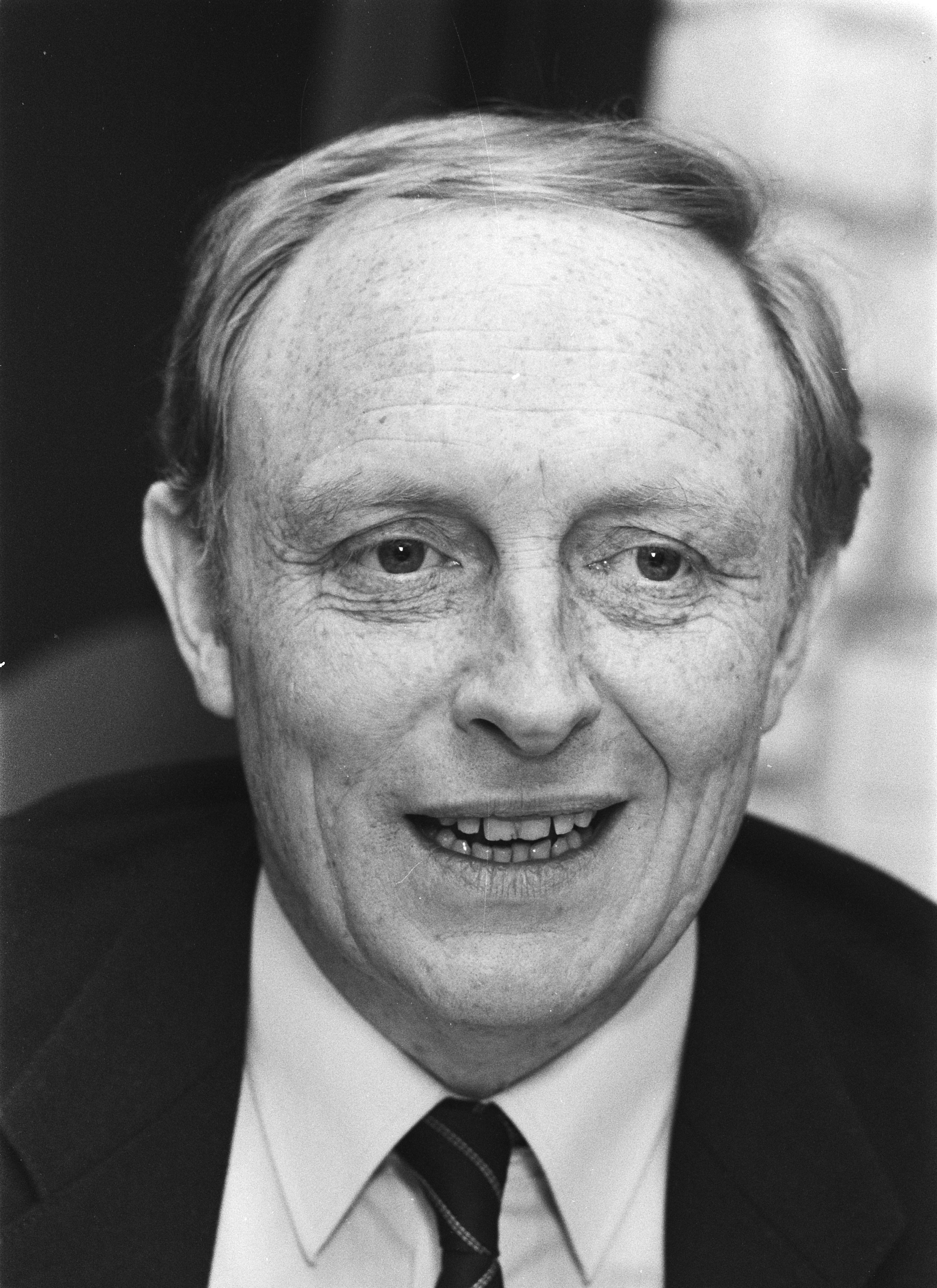
Neil Kinnock, the Labour Party leader when the term became widely used at the 1987 general election

The loony left is a pejorative term used to describe those considered to be politically hard left. First recorded as used in 1977, the term was widely used in the United Kingdom in the campaign for the 1987 general election and subsequently both by the Conservative Party and by British newspapers that supported the party, as well as by more moderate factions within the Labour movement to refer to the activities of more militantly left-wing politicians that they believed moderate voters would perceive as extreme or unreasonable.

The label was directed at the policies and actions of some Labour-led inner-city councils and some Labour Party politicians. Although the labels hard left and soft left reflected a genuine political division within the Labour Party, loony left was by far the more often used label than either. While academics have depicted the era as of the "new urban left" (such as the rate-capping rebellion) as a throwback to earlier municipal militancy (e.g. Poplarism), wider media coverage tended to focus on the personalities of city leaders such as the Greater London Council's Ken Livingstone and Liverpool's Derek Hatton.

== Origin and themes of the term ==
The term "loony left" as used to describe certain aspects of Labour politics was created by the British popular press a few years before the 1987 general election. Throughout the run-up to the election, it became a staple feature of press coverage of the election, with many stories running detailing the "antics" of Labour politicians and Labour-controlled local government authorities.

Jolyon Jenkins recorded in 1987 that 1986 was the climax of the Loony Left campaign:

[That it was the year] when the Sun announced that it was going to award a prize — a symbolic two-finger statuette — to the "looniest" council of them all [...] when the Daily Mail and The Mail on Sunday sent teams of reporters chasing round London boroughs in search of good (if not true) stories; when even The Times used the term without apparent irony. Most importantly, it was the year when Environment Secretary Nicholas Ridley and Conservative Party Chairman Norman Tebbit decided this could be harnessed as a vote winner for the Conservative Party.

The ridicule of the political left by some British newspapers has a far longer history. Petley observes that the British press had long since "perfected a way of representing the ideas and personalities associated with socialism as so deranged and psychotic that they represented a danger to society", thus rendering them fair game for editorial vilification. Following his party's defeat in the 1983 general election, one newspaper had characterised Michael Foot's habit of swinging his walking stick around as he went for his morning walk as being "like an escaped loony". The election of Ken Livingstone to the leadership of the Greater London Council in 1981 had him regularly described in newspapers as "barmy" or "loony", with the GLC's policies labelled "crazy". These labels were increasingly also applied to local councils within London: The 13 March 1983 Sunday People labelled Islington local council the "Bananas republic"; and the 13 February 1983 Mail on Sunday labelled it "The mad mad mad mad world of Islington". In some ways, the "Loony Left" campaign was a generalisation of the Conservative campaign of demonising Livingstone and the GLC.

As recorded by Jenkins, the climax of the campaign was in 1986 and pivotal moments in its history were the London local council elections held in May 1986 and the 1987 Greenwich by-election, as well as of course the campaign for the 1987 general election.

The general theme that the "loony left" label suggested was twofold, and Labour Party local government authorities were perceived to be:

- Irrationally obsessed with minority and fringe issues.
- Paranoid about racial and sexual "problems" that were wholly imaginary on their parts, without actual substance.

"Loony left" was also used to describe specific individuals. Neil Kinnock, who had been subject to press vituperation since his election as party leader, was associated with the "loony left" when, in March 1987, he endorsed a rise of 60% in local council rates in Ealing, where he was a rate-payer. The Sun gave this the headline "Kinnock admits — I back loonies" and other newspapers put this forward as an example of support for extremism by the Labour Party leadership. A later story in the Daily Express about how Ken Livingstone purportedly had a left-wing takeover of the party arranged was denied by the Labour leadership; this was subsequently reported as "Neil Denies Truth About Left Plot".

Likewise, Deirdrie Wood, Labour candidate in the 1987 Greenwich by-election, came to be known in the press as "Dreadful Deirdrie". Wood had been selected by her local constituency party against opposition from the Labour leadership. Privately, she had promised Kinnock, "I won't drop you in it", to which he had replied, "It's not you, it's those bastards out there", referring to the press. Labour presented her as "a hard-working local woman with sensible policies", but the press portrayed her as a radical extremist by association, as an Irish Republican Army sympathiser living with a militant shop steward who was not the father of her children. She was also depicted personally as a "hard left feminist, anti-racist and gay-rights supporter" (as one News of the World report put it) who wanted to twin London schools with Palestine Liberation Organization camps.

Local authorities were the primary targets, though, in part because progressives had found their platform there in the 1980s. This was caused by two factors: a change in the composition of local authorities and the general election defeats for Labour from 1979 onwards. Partly because of structural changes to local authorities enacted in 1974, including the end of local aldermanic dignities and partly simply as a result of an influx of new people whose background had been in the radical youth movements of the 1960s, local government authorities became highly partisan political battlegrounds in the 1970s and 1980s that a canny politician would be able to use to construct a power base and as a stepping stone to a career in national-level politics.

This was compounded by Labour's general election defeats, leaving the party with little ability to push its agenda at a national level in Westminster. As a result, local authorities became hotbeds of progressive and radical ideas, and a conflict between local Labour local authorities and the Conservative central government on many issues ensued. As in the previous era of municipal socialism, Labour leaderships at local level saw themselves as stronger than their Westminster party colleagues and capable of pushing socialist political agendas where they could not be pushed at national level. This resulted in an era of "grand gesture politics", with local authorities taking highly visible stances on national political issues such as declaring themselves nuclear-free zones and "rainbow coalitions" between local Labour Party politicians and pressure groups for causes outside of Labour's traditional working-class roots, such as anti-racism, gay rights, disabled rights and feminist groups.

Unfortunately for Labour, the wide range of local-level policy initiatives that this engendered made it easy for Conservative opponents to apply the "Loony Left" blanket label that the news media had handed to them, a political card that the Conservatives played at both local and national levels. The label was a particularly effective tactic against Labour-controlled local education authorities because the suggestion of innocent children being manipulated to further cynical adult political goals was a very potent image.

== Persistence of the idea and counteraction by the Labour Party ==
The label still occurs in British political discourse, even in the 21st century and has become a firmly embedded feature of British journalism. However, changes made by the Labour Party after the 1987 general election to ensure that it was no longer associated in the public mind with the images of the "Loony Left" from 1986 to 1987 have since blunted its impact and reduced its power, to the extent that it had far less impact on the 1992 general election, less even (according to academic studies by Butler and Kavanaugh) than Labour Party officials themselves believed at the time post-election.

These changes were in part an increased awareness of how important news media were to Labour's election campaign. One party press secretary said of Labour's attitude to the news media in the 1983 general election campaign: "If a miracle had happened and Fleet Street had suddenly come clamouring to Walworth Road for pro-Labour material, they would have been sent away with a copy of the manifesto each". The party leadership noted afterwards that it had been the effect of the "Loony Left" image that had caused it to lose the 1987 Greenwich by-election by such a large margin. While Labour did not ignore the press, senior Labour figures became reluctant to talk to reporters. Kinnock refused to talk to the press on the flight back from his visit to the U.S. President Ronald Reagan after British journalists had continually sought a story that would represent the trip in a negative light. Similarly, Patricia Hewitt, then party press secretary, considered abandoning holding daily press conferences in the run-up to the 1987 general election because "they allow the newspaper journalists to set the agenda ... and we know where they stand".

In a widely leaked letter written to Frank Dobson after the Greenwich by-election and published by the Sun under the headline "Gays put Kinnock in a panic — secret letter lashes loonies", Hewitt said:

It is obvious from our own polling, as well as from the doorstep, that the "London effect" is now very noticeable. The "Loony Labour Left" is now taking its toll; the gays and lesbians issue is costing us dear amongst the pensioners and fear of extremism and higher taxes/rates is particularly prominent in the GLC area.

Nick Raynsford similarly ascribed the general election defeat to the "Loony Left" and other factors stating after the election that there were "too many worrying skeletons in the Labour Party cupboard deterring voters". In general, the "soft left" portion of the Labour Party blamed the "Loony Left" perception for this third general election defeat, despite the election campaign having been, in Larry Whitty's words, "the most effective campaign the party has ever waged". According to the "soft left", the Labour-controlled local government authorities had made errors in both pace and presentation, albeit that almost any initiative relating to race or sex, no matter how presented or paced, would have been seized by the press and held up for vilification.

Even before the election, Labour was working hard to distance itself from the "Loony Left" perception. At the time of Brent Council's initiative to appoint race-relations advisers to schools, the party's deputy leader Roy Hattersley said, "I do not deny the existence of unacceptable behaviour in some local education authorities. I want to eliminate it." Similarly, a question-and-answer pamphlet for voters prepared by staff at Labour headquarters had the question: "But if I vote Labour won't I get a loony left council like those in London?", to which the answer given was: "Left councils are exceptions, Neil Kinnock has told them to mend their ways and he is in full charge of the Labour Party."

On several occasions, the Labour Party leadership and others attempted to take a hard line on the "Loony Left" to gain a more favourable impression in the media. On 3 April 1987, for example, five Labour MPs with constituencies in Birmingham — Roy Hattersley, Denis Howell, Jeff Rooker, Terry Davis and Robin Corbett — wrote to Sharon Atkin, Bernie Grant and Linda Bellos in letters that they themselves leaked to the newspapers, demanding that they not attend a meeting in Birmingham, scheduled for 7 April, of activists campaigning for Black Sections within the Labour Party. Similarly, after the Greenwich by-election defeat five London Labour Party members — Brian Nicholson, Roger Godsiff, John Spellar, Roy Shaw and Dianne Hayter — formed the "Londoners for Labour" association, according to their press releases aimed at reclaiming the London Labour Party from "the loonies".

The 1980s UK press campaign against the "Loony Left" was echoed in the 1990s in the United States where sections of the press campaigned against political correctness, using much the same rhetoric. The same accusations made by the British press in the 1980s were levelled by U.S. newspapers such as The Chicago Tribune, The New Republic, Time, Newsweek and New York.

== Exemplification ==
As Jenkins noted, the truth of the stories mattered less than their resonance with voter fears. Three of the most famously recorded instances of "Loony Left" activities—the renaming of the nursery rhyme "Baa, Baa, Black Sheep," of "manhole covers" and of "black bin-liner bags"—were myths, outright fabrications by the press. Other stories, such as reports that London councils had insisted that homosexuals be placed at the heads of the waiting lists for council housing and that London councils had spent £500,000 on "24 super-loos for gypsies", were found to be highly misleading upon investigation by the Media Research Group of Goldsmiths' College, University of London.

The report of the MRG investigation estimated that some 3,000 news stories about the "Loony Left" ran between 1981 and 1987 in the British tabloid press alone. It determined that many of these stories were either partially or wholly fabricated and that their targets, against whom they aimed to inflame public opinion, were a few London local councils that were under Labour Party control.

=== "Baa Baa White Sheep" ===
Variants of the story that the nursery rhyme "Baa Baa Black Sheep" had been banned because it had racial undertones have been reported repeatedly by the British mass media since 1986, to the state at which it has almost gained the status of an urban myth. Both The Age and The Herald reported in 2002, for example, the same "Baa Baa White Sheep" story, ascribing it to a parent of a child attending Paston Ridings Primary School in London.

The original story reported a ban at Beevers Nursery, a privately run nursery school in Hackney. It was originally reported by Bill Akass, then a journalist at the Daily Star in the 15 February 1986 edition under the headline "Now it's Baa Baa Blank Sheep". Akass had heard of a ban issued, by nursery school staff, on the singing of "Baa, Baa, Black Sheep" on the grounds that it was racist. In his story, he wrote:

Staff at a nursery school in Hackney, London, claim that the traditional nursery rhyme is offensive to blacks. At first, they wanted the 30 children aged between one and three — only two of whom are black — to sing Baa Baa White Sheep instead. But now it has been banned altogether at Beevers Nursery in De Beauvoir Road. Leaders of left-wing Hackney council welcomed the ban last night. A spokesman said: "We consider playgroups and nurseries should be discouraged from singing the rhyme. It reinforces a derogatory and subservient use of the word 'black' among our youngsters in their formative years. This is particularly important because the majority of children in our nurseries come from black and ethnic minority communities."

The nursery was run by the parents, rather than by Hackney council, but Akass had telephoned Hackney council for its reaction to his story. Martin Bostock, then the press officer for Hackney council, reported that he had considered the possibility of simply responding: "We don't know what this nursery is doing, but whatever they're doing it is up to them". However, according to council leader Tony Millwood, Bostock rejected this advice and wanted to take a more supportive stance on the alleged ban and in conjunction with the press office drafted and issued a statement saying "that we supported what they'd done, although making it quite clear that it was not a council nursery and not a council ban".

Three days later in the 18 February 1986 Hackney Gazette, Tim Cooper took up Akass's story. He went to Beevers Nursery and asked parents there what their reactions were in turn to the Hackney council statement itself a reaction to the claim that Beevers had issued a ban. Cooper's story reported one of the nursery playleaders as saying: "We're run by parents and if they want us to stop singing it, we would. But there have been no complaints so far, though someone once suggested it could be racist". Cooper later stated that there had been no such ban, but that the statement issued by Millwood and Hackney council had given the story the impetus that it was then to run with:

I think they really shot themselves in the foot. I think they issued the statement because they, or the council leader at the time, believed that the ban was in force and tried to justify it. I think that they were wrong. There was no ban in the first place. By issuing the statement they virtually created the story, which obviously snowballed from there

In fact, the playgroup leaders had requested the racialism awareness course, at which attendance was not compulsory, there had been no ban imposed by Haringey council and there was no evidence that the rhyme had even been discussed on the course. As before, only newspapers for the British black community reported these facts. The attempts by the Daily Mail to fact check the story that it had run, including posing as parents looking for playgroups and as supermarket managers wanting to run racism awareness courses, had failed to elicit a single playgroup worker who would confirm the alleged council ban.

Haringey council initiated legal action against the Daily Mail, but was forced to drop it due to lack of funds.

The Daily Mail ran the story again on 20 October, comparing Haringey council to Nazi Germany. Again, only the British black community newspapers (the 3 November Asian Herald and the 5 November West Indian News) carried Haringey council's corrections. The story continued to be carried by many newspapers for months thereafter, including The Economist on 1 November and the Islington Gazette on 20 February 1987, this time with Islington council as the ban-issuer, a fact that was explicitly denied by a council spokesman in the piece, who said that "it is not council policy to ban Baa Baa Black Sheep but if individual nursery workers find it offensive the council is not in the business of forcing them to teach that rhyme rather than others".

Even other political parties ran with the story. A party election broadcast for the Social Democratic Party, fronted by John Cleese, named Islington council as "the council that accused a five year old of reciting a racially offensive poem". Islington council sought an injunction in the High Court to have this material excluded, but this was denied by Mr Justice Drake. David Owen dropped the material anyway, stating that it was to avoid further distress to the five-year-old's family. Ironically, the press reported Owen's press conference, announcing this change as "loony" David Owen "outclowning anything that Basil Fawlty could have thought up".

In 2000, the BBC reported the withdrawal of guidance to nursery schools by Birmingham City Council that "Baa, Baa, Black Sheep" should not be taught.

=== Peter Jenkins ===
Peter Jenkins, a columnist for The Guardian and The Independent, recorded policies which were dubbed "loony left" by the media. For instance, Haringey council allowed only Nicaraguan coffee to be sold and introduced courses on homosexuality into its nursery and primary schools.

Hackney London Borough Council ended its twinning arrangements with France, West Germany and Israel and made new twinnings with the Soviet Union, East Germany and Nicaragua. A spokesperson for the council explained: "This will enable us to concentrate on our new friends". When Sinn Féin representatives were invited to speak to Hackney council, a Liberal fired a revolver and there was a fight in the council chamber.

Lambeth London Borough Council banned the word "family" from council literature because this was "discriminatory" and police were banned from using council facilities. Lambeth council's leader, Linda Bellos, claimed: "I think the police are bent on war".

Ealing council removed all books it considered to be "racist" and "sexist" from its local libraries. An Inner London Education Authority (ILEA) teaching pack titled Auschwitz: Yesterday's Racism drew comparisons between the trade union legislation of Adolf Hitler and Margaret Thatcher. Another ILEA school in Kennington discouraged competitive games and making pupils write protest letters was made part of the school time-table.

== See also ==
- Champagne socialist
- Limousine liberal
- Moonbat
- People's Republic of South Yorkshire
- Political correctness
- Social justice warrior
- Woke
