= SetACL =

Security software

- Developer(s): Helge Klein
- Stable release: 3.0.6 / 7 September 2012
- Operating system: Microsoft Windows
- Type: Utility software
- License: Freeware
- Website: helgeklein.com/setacl

SetACL is a freeware utility for manipulating security descriptors on Microsoft Windows. It used to be available under the GNU Lesser General Public License (LGPL) as a command-line utility and as an ActiveX component, but changed to a freeware license in version 3.0.0.0.

== Features ==
This list of features is taken from the product's web page.

- Supports the following object types on Windows 2000 and later
  - NTFS files and directories
  - registry keys
  - printers
  - services
  - network shares
  - WMI objects
- Manage permissions on local or remote systems in domains or workgroups.
- Set multiple permissions for multiple users or groups in a single command.
- Control how permissions are inherited.
- List, backup and restore permissions.
- All operations work on a single object or recursively on a directory or registry tree.
- Set the owner to any user or group.
- Unicode support.
- Remove, replace or copy a user or group from an ACL.
- Fast performance due to time-consuming steps such as recursing a large file system are performed only once.
- Filter out object names not to be processed.

== Usage ==
To set 'change' permissions on the directory 'C:\angela' for user 'brian' in domain 'dom1':

 SetACL.exe -on "C:\angela" -ot file -actn ace
            -ace "n:dom1\brian;p:change"

Remove write and change permission sets from Desktop, replace with 'read and execute' permissions:

 SetACL.exe -on "\\mycomputer\C$\Documents and Settings\username\Desktop" -ot file 
            -actn ace -ace "n:mycomputer\username;p:write,change;m:revoke"
            -ace "n:mycomputer\username;p:read_ex"

An example of its use from AutoIt can be found here.

== Short history ==
- March 2001 SetACL program 0.x development begins
- December 2002 SetACL program 2.x development begins
- April 2003 2.0 beta 1 released
- July 2003 2.0 final released
- September 2003 2.0.1.0 released – Remove, replace or copy all Access Control Entries (ACEs) belonging to users or groups of a specified domain.
- January 2004 2.0.2 released – ActiveX support. can be used from any language that supports COM including AutoIt, Visual Basic, Perl, VBScript.
- May 2008 2.0.3 released – 64-bit support
- August 2010 2.1 released – Improved permission listing
