= Muffler (disambiguation) =

A muffler is a device for reducing the amount of noise emitted by a machine.

Muffler may also refer to:

- Muffler (scarf), a common type of scarf
- A silencer fitted to a gun, known as a suppressor

== Surname ==
- Betty Muffler, Aboriginal Australian artist and healer
- Michael and Heidrun Muffler, architects

== See also ==
- Muffle
- Sound attenuator
- Ear muff
