= Wingnut =

Wingnut may refer to:

== Botany ==
- Pterocarya, a genus of trees bearing winged nuts
- Terminalia canescens, a species of tree native to northern Australia

== Entertainment ==
- Wing Nuts: Battle in the Sky, a video game created by Rocket Science Games
- Wingnut, a character in the Care Bears franchise introduced in the movie Care Bears: Oopsy Does It!
- Wingnut, a character in the Teenage Mutant Ninja Turtles franchise
- WingNuts: Temporal Navigator, a computer game created by Freeverse Software

== Sports ==
- Wichita Wingnuts, a Wichita, Kansas, baseball team
- Wingnut, nickname of Australian cricketer Adam Gilchrist
- Wingnut, nickname of Robert Weaver (born 1965), an American surfer
- WingNuts, name of a capsized sports boat involving fatalities in the 2011 Chicago Yacht Club Race to Mackinac

== Other uses ==
- Wingnut (hardware), a nut with a pair of wings to enable it to be easily turned by hand
- Wingnut (politics), an American slang term for a person who holds extreme political views
- WingNut Films, film production company owned by Peter Jackson
