= Napkin (disambiguation) =

A napkin or serviette is a rectangle of cloth or paper used for wiping the mouth or fingers while eating.

Napkin may also refer to:

- Sanitary napkin, a pad for menstrual control
- A 'nappy', a cloth or disposable diaper in the South African region, formerly in use in British English
- "Napkins", a 2024 episode of The Bear TV show
