= Pumping =

Pumping may refer to:

- The operation of a pump, for moving a liquid from one location to another
  - The use of a breast pump for extraction of milk
- Pumping (audio), a creative misuse of dynamic range compression
- Pumping (computer systems), the number of times data is transmitted per clock cycle
- Pumping (oil well), injecting chemicals into a wellbore
- Pumping (noise reduction), an unwanted artifact of some noise reduction systems
- Pumping lemma, in the theory of formal languages
- Gastric lavage, cleaning the contents of the stomach
- Optical pumping, in which light is used to raise electrons from a lower energy level to a higher one
- Pump (skateboarding), accelerating without pushing off of the ground
- "Pumping" (My Heart), a 1976 song by Patti Smith Group
