= Security Descriptor Definition Language =

Security Descriptor Definition Language (SDDL) defines the string format that is used to describe a security descriptor as a text string.

== See also ==
- Security descriptor
