= Precinct =

Precinct may refer to:

- An electoral precinct
- A police precinct
- A religious precinct
- A shopping arcade or shopping mall
  - A Pedestrian zone

== Places ==
- A neighborhood, in Australia
- A unit of public housing in Singapore
- A former electoral subdivision of the wards of the City of London that elected a Common Councilman
- A Texas electoral district that elects a member of a commissioners' court or a Texas constable
- A minor civil division in certain US states including Nebraska and Illinois
  - See List of precincts in Illinois
- Precinct, Missouri
- Upper and Lower Precinct, a pedestrianised shopping area in Coventry, England

== Arts ==
- The Precinct (film), a 2010 film
- The Precinct (video game), a 2025 action RPG
