= Shingle =

Shingle(s) may refer to:

== Construction ==
- Roof shingles or wall shingles, including:
  - Wood shingle
    - Shake (shingle), a wooden shingle that is split from a bolt, with a more rustic appearance than a sawed shingle
    - Quercus imbricaria, or shingle oak, a wood used for shingles
  - Asbestos shingle, roof or wall shingles made with asbestos-cement board
  - Asphalt shingle, a common residential roofing material in North America
  - Roof tiles, made of ceramic or other materials
  - Slate shingle, roof or wall shingles made of slate
  - Solar shingle, a solar collector designed to look like a roof shingle
- Shingle style architecture, a plain American house style with little ornamentation

== Science and technology ==
- Shingles (Herpes zoster), a disease of the nerves
- Shingling (metallurgy), the process of consolidating iron or steel with a hammer during production
- Shingle back (Trachydosaurus rugosus), a species of skink found in Australia
- Shingled magnetic recording (SMR), a magnetic storage data recording technology used in hard disk drives
- In text mining, a token-level n-gram

== Other uses ==
- Shingle beach, especially in Europe, a beach composed of pebbles and cobbles
- Shingle bob, a short hairstyle for women in the mid-1920s
- Shingle Cove, Antarctica
- Shingle dancing, a form of solo dancing akin to tap dancing, of African American origin
- Shingle Springs, California, formerly known as Shingle
- "Shit on a shingle", slang for chipped beef on toast
- The Shingles, a sandbank near the landform the Needles, on the Isle of Wight
