= Wingnut (politics) =

Right-wing political extremism

"Wingnut", wing nut or wing-nut, is a pejorative American political term referring to a person who holds extreme, and often irrational, political views. It is a reference to the extreme "wings" of a party, and shares a name with the hardware fastener also known as a wingnut.

== Definitions and etymology ==
According to Merriam-Webster, a "wingnut" is "a mentally deranged person" or "one who advocates extreme measures or changes: radical". Lexico, an online dictionary whose content comes from Oxford University Press, gives the political definition of "wing nut" as "A person with extreme, typically right-wing, views."

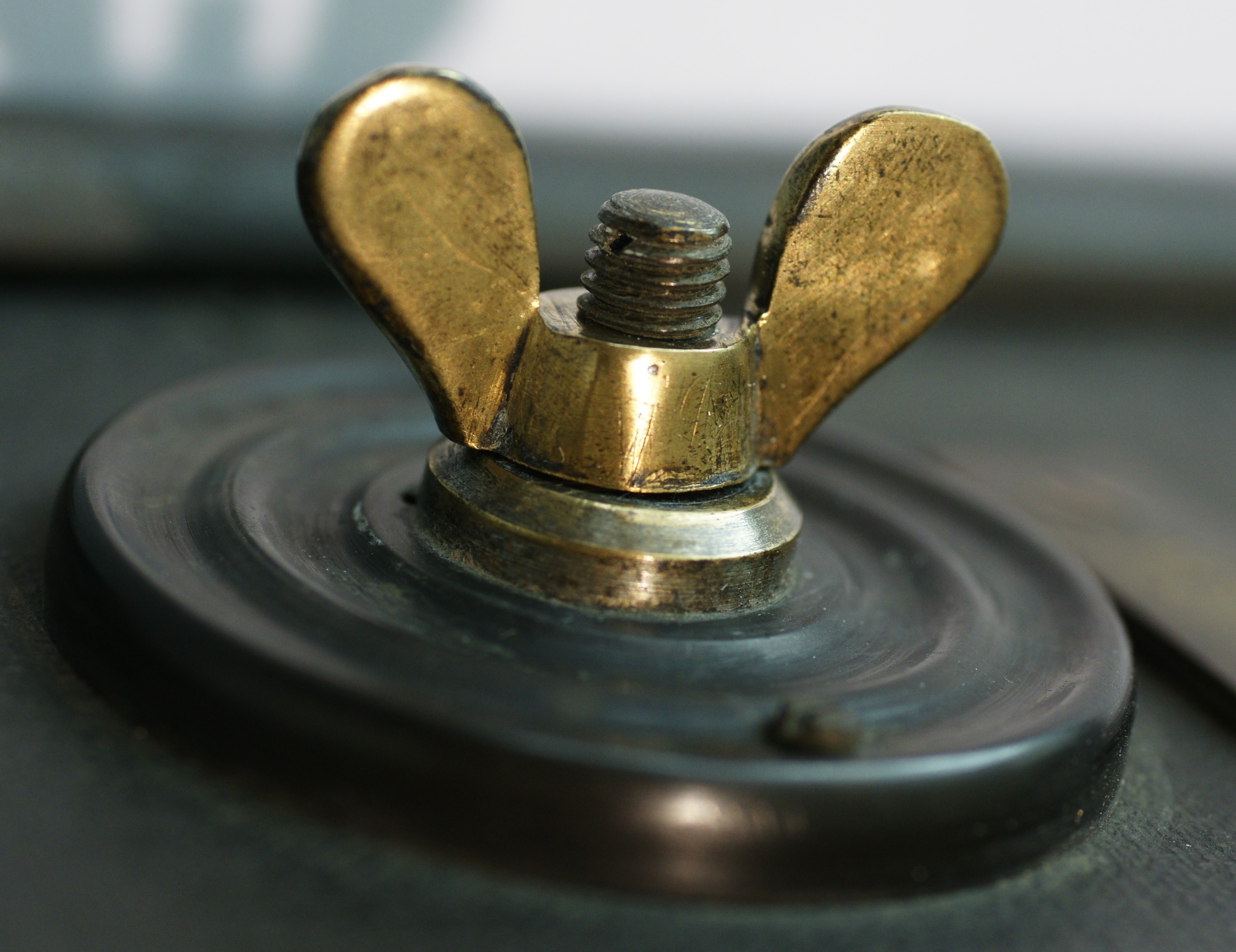
A hardware wingnut tightened to a bolt to act as a fastener.

When William Safire – who was widely known as the "language maven" and wrote the "On Language" column for The New York Times Magazine from 1979 until 2009 – first wrote about "wing nut" in 2004, he said "In current political parlance ... the word is now beginning its bid to replace the tiring extremist. ... The true believers of each side consider those similarly inclined on the other to be nuts and kooks, a satisfying arrangement of derangement. ... The attack word catching on with political nonwingers and by mainstreaming media is wing nut. It is applied with supposed fine impartiality to both left-wing kooks and right-wing nuts", but by 2006, Safire would say "The prevailing put-down of right-wing bloggers is wingnuts; this has recently been countered by the vilification of left-wing partisans who use the Web as moonbats..." Later that year, Safire provided an example of the usage of "wingnut" in a Time magazine column by Joe Klein, in which Klein referred to "conservative wingnuts" (as opposed to "left-wing blognuts"), called Vice President Dick Cheney "the nation’s wingnut in chief", and said of the editorial page of The Wall Street Journal that it was "quasi-wingnut".

Two years later, in his book Safire's Political Dictionary, Safire was more definitive about the meaning and etymology of the word:

...[T]he political wingnut is an abbreviation of a longer term, in this case right-wing nut where nut, as slang for the head, has long been used to refer to a person who is silly, stupid, crazy, or simply nutty. ... The original right-wing nut is of considerable antiquity, dating at least to the 1960s...Today, the long and the short forms co-exist amicably in print.

David M. Herszenhorn of The New York Times has defined a "wing nut" as "a loud darling of cable television and talk radio whose remarks are outrageous but often serious enough not to be dismissed entirely," but he was careful to point out that the person he was so describing as a "wing nut" "...is the more notable because he hurls his nuts from the left in a winger world long associated with the right."

In his book Wingnuts: How the Lunatic Fringe is Hijacking America, author and columnist John Avlon defined a wingnut as "someone on the far-right wing or far-left wing of the political spectrum – the professional partisans, the unhinged activists and the paranoid conspiracy theorists. They're the people who always try to divide rather than unite us". Avlon also writes "I believe that the far left and the far right can be equally insane – but there's no question that in the first years of the Obama administration, the far right has been a lot crazier."

The examples Avlon gives of this "craziness" include the actions, beliefs and behaviors of those involved in the Oath Keepers, Posse Comitatus and other groups in the American militia movement, the Tea Party, "Obama derangement syndrome", the birth of "White-minority politics", the rise of right-wing media and the Republican echo chamber, Sarah Palin and the "Limbaugh brigades" of right-wing talk radio hosts, the Birther and Truther movements, and the GOP's "hyperconservative kamikaze caucus" in Congress. The only extended sections about "wingnuts" on the left deal with Keith Olbermann's news broadcasts, and the search by both sides for "heretics" within their respective parties, i.e. Republicans in Name Only and Democrats in Name Only (RINOs and DINOs).

== "Wingnut welfare" ==
In 2015, economist Paul Krugman wrote about "wingnut welfare" in his column for The New York Times. Krugman did not claim to have come up with the term, and did not know who did, (Note: An early reference to "wingnut welfare" can be found on "Political Animal", an unsigned feature published by CBS News on August 21, 2008. See "Wingnut Welfare") but he explained it as describing "the lavishly-funded ecosystem of billionaire-financed think tanks, media outlets, and so on [which] provides a comfortable cushion for politicians and pundits who tell such people what they want to hear. Lose an election, make economic forecasts that turn out laughably wrong, whatever — no matter, there’s always a fallback job available." Krugman wrote that "anyone who follows right-wing careers knows whereof I speak." In 2021, Krugman reiterated his use of the phrase in another column, in which he wrote:

[F]or a long time conservative cohesiveness made life relatively easy for Republican politicians and officials. Professional Democrats had to negotiate their way among sometimes competing demands from various constituencies. All Republicans had to do was follow the party line. Loyalty would be rewarded with safe seats, and should a Republican in good standing somehow happen to lose an election, support from billionaires meant that there was a safety net — “wing nut welfare” — in the form of chairs at lavishly funded right-wing think tanks, gigs at Fox News and so on.

The phrase has subsequently been used elsewhere, including in 2017 in the Washington Monthly by Martin Longman and in an opinion column in The Washington Post by political commentator Paul Waldman in 2018.

In 2021, writer Charles P. Pierce, the author of Idiot America: How Stupidity Became a Virtue in the Land of the Free described the career of one Texas political lawyer by saying "His CV reads like a road map through the wingnut-welfare legal terrarium". Pierce had also used the phrase in earlier columns in 2018 and 2020 in describing the actions and backgrounds of those on the political right.

== Other usage examples ==
In 2007, political commentator Jonathan Chait's recapitulation of the origin of Reaganomics, or supply-side economics, was published in The New Republic under the title "Feast of the Wingnuts". After describing some extreme applications of the Laffer curve made by Jude Wanniski, an editorial page writer for The Wall Street Journal in the 1970s, specifically in his book The Way the World Works (1978), Chait writes "Republicans did not find these obvious signs of wingnuttery troubling."

Folk punk musician Pat the Bunny founded a band called Wingnut Dishwashes Union, active from 2007 to 2009.

Tessa Stuart, writing in Rolling Stone magazine in 2016 referred to the Republican National Convention that year as having embraced "just about every version of 'Hillary Clinton' dreamed up over the last quarter century by wing-nuts like [Alex] Jones and his rhetorical cousin, Roger Stone. Needless to say, none of these 'Hillary Clintons' bear much resemblance to the Hillary Clinton on the campaign trail, nor would they be recognizable to people who don’t pay much attention to right-wing talk radio."

In 2020, historian and columnist Max Boot referred to an incoming member of Congress as a "QAnon wing nut", providing an example of the combination of "wing nut" with other pejorative descriptive modifiers. Boot also warned against a false equivalence, writing that "the media can give the impression, wittingly or not, that both major parties are in the grip of extremists. Nothing could be further from the truth. Democrats have the far left under control, while Republicans are being controlled by the far right." Such a view distorts the reality that the Republican Party under the leadership of Donald Trump is dominated by far-right ideologues and extremists – that is, wingnuts – while there is no such equivalent in the Democratic Party. Boot continued, "Trump & Co. can bellow all day long that [Joe Biden and Kamala Harris] are lackeys for [Senator Bernie] Sanders and 'the Squad,' [i.e. six progressive Democratic members of Congress, notably including Alexandria Ocasio-Cortez (AOC), a Democratic socialist] but it's simply not credible. The Republican Party, by contrast, isn’t just catering to extremists — it’s led by one."

== See also ==
- Moonbat
- Fascist (insult)
- Gammon (insult)
- Radical right (United States)
