= Mail (disambiguation) =

Mail is a system for physically transporting postcards, letters, and parcels.

Historically, mail specifically meant a bag containing letters to be delivered by post.

Mail or The Mail may also refer to:

== Newspapers ==
- Daily Mail, a British newspaper
  - The Mail on Sunday
  - MailOnline
- Sunday Mail (Adelaide), formerly The Mail, an Australian newspaper
- The Mail (Madras), formerly The Madras Mail
- The Mail (Cumbria), a British local newspaper
- The Mail (Zimbabwe), a newspaper

== Electronic mail and online services ==
- mail (Unix), a command line email client
- Mail (Windows), an e-mail client
- Apple Mail, an email client
- Email, electronic mail
- mail.com, a web portal and web-based email service provider
- Mail.Ru, a Russian email and online services provider

== Other uses ==
- Chain mail, personal armour
- Mail (film), a 2021 Indian Telugu-language film
- Mail (manga), a Japanese comic
- Mail, Shetland, a hamlet in the Shetland Islands, UK
- Ministry of Agriculture, Irrigation and Livestock (MAIL), Afghanistan
- Greg Mail (born 1978), Australian cricketer
- Josh Mail (1974–2025), Australian rules footballer
- Mailing, Fuchuan County, China

== See also ==
- Post box
