= List of retronyms =

A retronym is a newer name for an existing subject, that differentiates the original form or version from a subsequent one. Retronyms are typically used as a self-explanatory adjective for a subject. Retronyms are introduced to differentiate the already existing things from the newer ones.

== Retronymic adjectives ==
Analog
Describes non-digital electronic devices that deal with analog signals, devices (electronic or otherwise) that display a readout analogously (i.e., clocks, gauges), or more colloquially, non-electronic means of accomplishing a task:

- Analog clock: Before digital clocks, most clocks had faces and hands. See also: Analog watch.
- Analog drawing: Drawing with conventional tools on a paper or canvas, as opposed to drawing on a computer using a software.
- Analog photography
- Analog video
- Analog synthesizer: Before synthesizers contained microchips, every stage of the internal electronic signal flow was analogous to a sound that would eventually be produced at the output stage, and this sound was shaped and altered as it passed through each filter and envelope.
- Analog watch: Before the advent of the digital watch, all watches had faces and hands. After the advent of the digital watch, watches with faces and hands became known as analog watches.
- Analog recording

Conventional, classic, or traditional
Describes devices or methods that have been largely replaced or significantly supplemented by new ones. For example, conventional (non-microwave) oven, or conventional weapon (one which does not incorporate chemical, biological or nuclear payloads).

- Classic Doctor Who: Used to distinguish the original series of the classic show from the 21st century sequel, New Doctor Who. This retronym is used by the BBC when both of these shows air.
- Classic Leave It to Beaver: Used to distinguish the original series of the classic sitcom from the 1980s sequel, The New Leave It To Beaver. This retronym was used by TBS when both of these shows aired.
- Classic Top Gear: Used to distinguish the original series of the classic program from the 2002 revival, New Top Gear. This retronym is used by the BBC when both of these shows air.
- Conventional airplane: In the late 1940s and early 1950s, this term was used to distinguish piston-engined aircraft from the new jet types.
- Conventional landing gear: Term used to distinguish the traditional landing gear arrangement of two main wheels and a tail wheel (also referred to as the "tail-dragger" type) from the newer tricycle landing gear (two main wheels and a nose wheel).
- Conventional memory: term coined when MS-DOS and other operating systems for the IBM PC and other IBM-like x86 machines went over the 640k memory limit with tricks to access extra memory with different code to address it.
- iPod classic : Suffix added from its 6th generation. Referring to the original iPod model that still used a hard drive as opposed to the flash-based iPod shuffle and iPod nano, and a click wheel as opposed to the touch screen-based iPod touch.
- Conventional oven: Before the development of the microwave oven, this term was not used. Now it is commonly found in cooking instructions for prepared foods. Sometimes, the term is used to distinguish a conventional gas or electric oven from a convection oven.
- Conventional war: Before the development of nuclear weapons, this term was not used. (War, Gwynne Dyer)
- Traditional braces: Used to refer to braces that are metal and crafted by hand, as opposed to Invisalign, and other new technologies.
- Traditional Chinese characters: Used to contrast with Simplified Chinese characters.
- Traditional animation: With the rise of computer animation, hand-drawn, cel-based (or "2D") animation is now referred to as this.

Civilian
Used to refer to items that are not of military quality or for military use, to differentiate them from the military version.
First, I, 1, 1.0, part 1, version 1, Senior, the Elder, etc.
Used when there is a second, third, fourth, etc. version/incarnation of something. This is not a retronym if it is used from the start in the anticipation of subsequent versions. When a dynastic ruler has or adopts the same name as a predecessor, the original is often retrospectively given the Roman numeral I if he did not already use one in his lifetime. For example, the Dutch prince William I of Orange was just William during his lifetime. On the other hand, e.g. emperor Franz Joseph I of Austria was so entitled even though there were no subsequent emperors of that name. In the United States, names (typically of males) may also follow this convention, or the father may be given the suffix Senior (Sr.), with Junior (Jr.) for the son; Roman numerals would be used if the name is repeated again. In some cases, such as US President George Bush, NASCAR racing driver Dale Earnhardt and Major League Baseball player Ken Griffey, well-known people have become retroactively referred to as "Senior" after namesake sons rose to prominence in their own right. Also sometimes used to refer to the first incarnation of a movie, video game, etc. after sequels have been created, although such works are seldom renamed in this way officially. When Sony released the PlayStation 2, a redesigned version of the original PlayStation was also released under the name PSone. However, the word "One" doesn't always refer to version 1 of a product, such as in Xbox One.
Freebase nicotine
The liquid, if containing nicotine, that is vaporised by electronic cigarettes with regular use. Nicotine strength levels would typically be measured and sold in mg/ml. This term would not be in regular use, and would therefore not become a retronym until liquid containing nicotine salts, sold in strength levels as a percentage composition, had entered the market.
Manual
Used to distinguish from automatic or electric versions.

- Manual transmissions in vehicles were just called "transmissions" until the invention of automatic transmissions. Sometimes they are called "standard" transmissions, but that adjective has become a misnomer in the United States since automatic transmissions have become the standard feature for most models today.
- Manual typewriters were likewise just called "typewriters" until the invention of electric typewriters.

Natural
Use to distinguish from artificial versions.

- Natural dyes like woad, indigo, saffron and madder were simply "dyes" until synthetic dyes were developed in the mid-19th century.
- Natural gums were just "gums" until synthetic gums were invented.
- Natural languages are those which evolved naturally in humans through use and repetition without conscious planning or premeditation, as opposed to recently developed constructed languages and formal languages.
- Natural ropes or plant ropes, such as those made from hemp or sisal, were just "ropes" until ropes made of synthetic materials became common.
- Natural satellites were just called "satellites" until the launch of Sputnik 1. Nowadays, the term satellite is far more often used to refer to communications satellites.
- Natural skin care involves the use of topical creams and lotions made of ingredients available in nature; all skin care was natural until synthetic cosmetics were invented.
- Natural sponge: all sponges were natural (either made from Luffa aegyptiaca or animal sponges) until polyester and polyurethane sponges came on the market in the mid-20th century.
- Natural rubber or India rubber was simply called "rubber" until synthetic rubber was invented in 1909.

Old

- Naturally used when there is officially a "new" version of anything, to refer to the previous version. For example, when British money was decimalized and the new penny of 1/100 pound was adopted, the previous penny of 1/240 pound became known as the old penny.
- Old-fashioned refers to any practice which is no longer customary, e.g. in the context of dress sense, hairstyle or wording, as opposed to (the) fashion, which refers to anything which is at present customary. In popular music and the wider popular culture, the term old school (originally only used in hip-hop, but now in many other genres) has developed a similar meaning, and this has spread to other areas as well.

Offline
Computer users will sometimes agree to meet offline, i.e. face to face in the real world, as opposed to online in an Internet-based chat room or other such means of electronic communication. Before the Internet became widely used, this was of course the only way to "meet" someone and the term to meet offline was unheard of. Stephen Colbert, on his 4 February 2016 broadcast of The Late Show with Stephen Colbert, remarked on the strangeness of so-called "offline shopping", regarding Amazon.com's retail bookstore endeavor.
Real
Often used in a derogatory manner to signify that the original product is the "real" product, as if the new alternative is "fake". For example, "Real instruments" for instruments other than the synth; "Real car" for a fuel-burning car, as opposed to an electric car.
Regular or plain
Used to refer to an original product after new versions are released. For example, one could formerly just ask for a Pepsi. But with the advent of multiple versions like Diet Pepsi and Pepsi Max, one might ask for a regular Pepsi when one wants the original drink. Similarly, regular Oreo cookies were called that after Double Stuf Oreos and other varieties were released. Another example is that in the United States regular gasoline (petrol or petroleum spirit outside the U.S.) has now come to mean 87 octane-rated unleaded (ratings in other countries vary). In the United States almost all gasoline had tetraethyl lead additive and was sold as either regular gasoline (octane rating of 89) or high test (octane ratings of 91 or higher) until leaded petrol was phased out starting in the late 1970s; all new cars made since 1975 have catalytic converters.

- Plain M&M's: Plain M&M's candies (now Milk Chocolate) would not have been called that until 1954, when Peanut M&M's were introduced.
- Plain old telephone service (POTS): The term refers to the telephone service still available after the advent of more advanced forms of telephony, such as ISDN, mobile phones, and VoIP
- Plain text: Before word processing programs for computers with functions such as support for multiple fonts, underlining, bold/italic and other function came along, text files were simply just known as text. "Plain text" is also used in contrast to ciphered text.
- Regular cab pickup truck (also called single cab) used when extended and crew/double cabs became widely available.
- Regular coffee: The development of decaffeinated coffee led to this coinage.
- Regular / Normal cigarette : A tobacco cigarette. Before electronic cigarettes became popular, all commercially available cigarettes were tobacco cigarettes. Along the same lines, the smoking of traditional cigarettes is sometimes referred to as "traditional smoking" in order to distinguish it from vaping, which could also be considered a form of smoking.

Tabletop
Used to describe the original version of a board game or role-playing game once a video game version has been released. Tabletop can also refer to non-digital games in general in order to contrast them from video games.
Vanilla
Used to describe an unaltered, plain version of an item, often in reference to software. For example, in computer games with expansion packs, it is used to distinguish the original version from subsequent versions, especially when the original game does not have a subtitle. For example, World of Warcraft could refer to either the original game or one of the expansion packs, so users may refer to the original as "vanilla" to distinguish it from the subsequent versions.
Wired
Wired or hardwired refer to products such as telephones, headphones, speakers, computer accessories, etc., which are now available in wireless versions. Wireless telegraphy and wireless telephony were some of the first applications of radio technology in the 1910s and 1920s; "wireless" as a noun today is sometimes simply a synonym for "mobile phone service"/"cell phone service".

== Nouns ==
=== Numbers ===
1994 Level
Before the Doom engine had more features added in source ports such as Boom ZDoom and Doom Legacy, all levels for Doom made around 1994 had limitations that constrained the gaming atmosphere. But when more features were added to source ports for better level atmospheres, older-style levels started to be called "1994 levels" to differentiate from the newer kind.
2D
With the increasing prevalence of 3D movies, conventional, non-3D versions of movies are starting to be called 2D versions. This is also used in reference to animation, to distinguish the older style hand-drawn or more recently vector-based animation from 3D-rendered animation.

=== A–B ===
Acoustic guitar
Before the invention of the solid-body electric guitar, all guitars amplified the sound of a plucked string with a resonating hollow body. Similarly: acoustic piano.
American Morse Code
This was the original signaling alphabet, suggested by Samuel Morse's assistant, Alfred Vail. It has a variety of different units and timings. It was later replaced by the Continental code (also called international Morse code), which has simpler timings and a different alphabet. Also called "railroad code".
AM radio
Before the introduction of broadcast FM radio, the AM broadcast band radio was known simply as radio, wireless (in the UK) or as medium-wave radio (still the preferred term among radio enthusiasts) to distinguish it from the (also amplitude-modulated) shortwave radio bands.
Animal Crossing: Population: Growing!
Used to refer to the original GameCube game after the release of its sequels. The name comes from its tagline in English-speaking regions.
Apple I
Originally released as the Apple Computer, it was renamed after the introduction of the Apple II personal computer.
Artistic gymnastics
Generally known simply as gymnastics before Rhythmic gymnastics was added to the Olympic program in 1984.
At-grade expressway
Since freeways are divided highways with 100% grade separations, expressways are at-grade highways with no direct private access. Some jurisdictions have different criteria on the difference of word use, but sometimes they are used interchangeably in areas that don't have many at-grade expressways. Since expressway and freeway are sometimes used interchangeably, the term at-grade expressway has been coined since there was a time when all expressways were at-grade; prior to the 1940s which is when California and Michigan planned out the nation's first freeways. States like Florida sometimes use the term "freeway" in reference to expressways (at-grade or grade-separated) which are free-of-charge to use.
Atari 2600
Originally sold as the Atari Video Computer System (or Atari VCS for short). When its successor, the Atari 5200, was released, the VCS was rebranded the Atari 2600, after its part number (CX-2600).
Bar soap
The common cake of soap used in the tub or shower was familiarly called "soap" or "bath soap"; the term "bar soap" arose with the advent of soaps in liquid and gel form.
Black Licorice
In North America, licorice is often called "black licorice" to distinguish it from similar confectionery varieties that are not flavored with licorice extract, and commonly manufactured in the form of chewy ropes or tubes.
Black powder
Called "gunpowder" for centuries while it was in common use. The retronym "black powder" was coined in the late 19th century to differentiate it from the newly developed smokeless powder which superseded it.
Black-and-white television
Once called simply television, now the retronym is used to distinguish it from color television, which is now more commonly referred to by the unadorned term. Along the same lines: broadcast television, free-to-air television, over-the-air television, silent movie. Furthermore, "Standard Definition Television" has become necessary to distinguish sets from HDTV (high definition).
Boeing 737 Classic
When Boeing introduced the 737 Next Generation (-600, -700, -800, and -900 series), the -300, -400, and -500 variants of the Boeing 737 still in service were called the 737 Classic.
Boeing 737 Original
The 737-100 and -200 were known simply as the "Boeing 737" at first; when the 737 Next Generation was introduced, and the 737-300, -400, and -500 were retrospectively designated as the 737 Classic, the 737-100 and -200 became known as the 737 Original to distinguish these even-older airplanes from the Classics.
Breadbin C64
When Commodore introduced the C64C, which had a redesigned case, the original C64 model was nicknamed the breadbin to differentiate it.
Brick-and-mortar school
A school that has a street address and building as opposed to an online school, which may have a main office building, but students can be located in a different locale than the teachers. The internet is used as a conduit for information exchanges, both synchronously and asynchronously.
Brick-and-mortar store, high street shop
As increasing use of the Internet allowed online stores, accessible only through computers, to compete with established retail shops, the latter began to be called "brick-and-mortar stores" or "high street shops" to indicate that customers could (or had to) visit them to examine and purchase their goods. These two terms are also often used to describe the physical storefronts of a retail business that also sells products online. In the U.S. and Canada, "brick-and-mortar" emphasizes the physical construction of these stores, as opposed to the largely electronic nature of online stores. The terms "high street shop" (UK) or "main street store" or "downtown store" (U.S. and Canada) also serve to differentiate the more traditional retail venue from big-chain "box stores" such as Kmart, Wal-Mart, or Zellers, which did not exist prior to the 1960s. (The name "High Street" is commonly used in the UK for a town's primary thoroughfare. In the U.S. and Canada, it is more likely to be called "Main Street".)
British English
Was simply referred to as "English" until North American English started to diverge from British English and became the more prevalent form of English in international media.
Broadcast television
This term was coined in the U.S. to distinguish it from cable and satellite television.
Brown rice
Prior to the mid nineteenth century, all rice consumed was brown or, whole grain. With the invention of white rice, brown began to refer to the traditional version.

=== C–E ===
Chicago II
Refers to the second album by the band Chicago. The album was originally entitled just Chicago but the name was changed after the release of the third album, Chicago III. (Their first album was called Chicago Transit Authority, as that was the name of the band at the time.)
Classical Hollywood Cinema
a term commonly used since the 1970s to refer to the mainstream commercial American cinema of roughly 1930–1960, which at the time was simply referred to as "Hollywood", "the cinema", "the movies" etc. (see 'film noir' below).
Classic Apple
After Apple bought NeXT in 1997 and later became profitable, people began to refer to the pre-1997 history of the company as Classic Apple to differentiate it from the post-1997 Apple as the company was near bankruptcy when it bought NeXT. Apple nowadays is very successful and popular.
Classic rock
a radio format referring to blues rock and hard rock music from the 1960s to the 1990s. The radio format previously was known as Album-oriented rock.
Classic Mac OS
Originally called System Software and later Mac OS, Apple retroactively added Classic to versions of the operating system from 1 to 9.2.2 (which were partly based on Lisa OS) to differentiate them from the newer macOS (formerly known as Mac OS X and OS X), which was based on NeXTSTEP.
Cloth diaper (Terry nappy)
Before the second half of the 20th century, all diapers (nappies, in the UK) were made from cloth (terry cloth) and simply called diapers (US) or nappies (UK). The advent of the disposable diaper gave rise to this term.
Command & Conquer: Tiberian Dawn
This name is sometimes used by fans of the Command & Conquer series to refer to the original game of the series, officially known simply as Command & Conquer.
Complex instruction set computer
This name was coined after the advent of Reduced instruction set computer.
Constitution Act, 1867
Prior to 1982, when the patriation of the constitution occurred, Canada's constitution was known as British North America Act 1867.
Corn on the cob
Before canned corn was widely available, "corn on the cob" was simply "corn".
Bic Cristal
Before the 2000s, the Bic Cristal was named "Bic Classic" pen. Prior to the 1990s, "Bic Classic" was referred to simply as the "Bic pen".
CSI: Las Vegas
Not used before the debut of the spinoff series CSI: Miami in 2002, and CSI: NY in 2004.
Curved, curly or smart quotes
Straight quotes were made widespread by typewriters. The smart designation came about as word processing software would often change straight quotes into curved quotes.
Data-transfer USB port
Before "recharge-only" (or powered USB) came along, all USB ports could both transfer data, and "recharge" mobile devices.
Day baseball
Baseball played during the day, as all games were played before electric lighting in stadiums became common.
Dairy milk
Used to refer to actual milk from a mammal's mammary glands, as opposed to plant milks like soy milk, rice milk, almond milk, and coconut milk.
Disposable battery
Before rechargeable batteries became popular in AA, AAA, C, D and PP3 form factors, all batteries in those form factors were disposable. Rechargeable batteries back then did exist, but were limited to stationary and vehicular (sometimes semi-portable) applications.
Divided expressway/freeway (USA)
Early expressways and freeways were divided corridors, but recent concepts of freeways and expressways have included occasional undivided corridors for economic and environmental compromises, as well as an initial phase prior to twinning. But it is unclear whether undivided versions existed first. However, the expressway, parkway and freeway concepts were developed with divided highways in mind during the 1910s (parkways) and 1940s (freeways), the German Autobahn would be conceptualized around the same time with similar qualities to freeways.
Dumb bomb
a bomb dropped from a bomber plane, with no guidance systems. Not used before guided missiles were invented and replaced the free-fall bombs.
Dumb phone
A phone with either no or limited internet capabilities. These phones also have no or limited ability to run apps. Before smartphones became popular, these were simply considered 'phones' or 'cellphones'. They are also sometimes referred to as feature phones or "flip phones".
English muffin
Originally called a 'muffin' in southern England, the prefix is now used to distinguish them from the American version.

=== F–H ===
Face-to-face conference
A conference whose participants meet in the same room, as opposed to using telephones or video cameras (similarly:IRL-meeting = in-real-life meeting).
Farmall Regular
As explained at Farmall tractor, the name Farmall began as a model name but became a sub-brand name as additional models were developed.
Fat model
In the console collecting scene, a "Fat model" represents consoles released before a model that is more compact and has different hardware specifications, oftentimes a lower wattage processor which requires less cooling. Most notably the "Fat" PS2, "Fat" PS3, and "Fat" DS, all having far smaller slim revisions releasing later in their lifespans, although the Xbox 360, PS4, Xbox One, and PS5 all had initial models that may be considered "fat models" in relation to their later, slimmer revisions.
Field hockey (North America)
Known simply as "hockey" (as it still is in the UK and Ireland) until ice hockey and roller hockey became popular. (In addition, there is a game called street hockey, which evolved from ice hockey.) Similarly, Field soccer (Football) and Field lacrosse (lacrosse). (Both North America)
Film camera
As opposed to digital camera. Also, the use of a film camera is often referred to as "film photography", "analogue photography", or "traditional photography" in order to distinguish it from digital photography.
Film noir
Prior to the 1970s, films with "film noir" style were referred to in English-speaking countries simply as dramas or melodramas (see 'Classical Hollywood' above). The term was coined in the 1950s by French critics who were taking the products of Hollywood more seriously than critics in the English-speaking world tended to at the time.
First Gundam
A nickname, commonly used by Japanese fans of the franchise and coined shortly after the release of Zeta Gundam. Gundam 0079 is also used in the same fashion.
First Anglo-Dutch War
Renamed after the Second Anglo-Dutch War in 1664.
Fixedsys
The monospaced system font in Microsoft Windows 1.x and 2.x, simply called System under those systems. In Windows 3.0, System became a proportional font, and the original font was renamed Fixedsys.
Fortnite: Save the World
Originally titled Fortnite, it was renamed after the release of Fortnite: Battle Royale.
Forward slash
Before the introduction of ASCII and electronic keyboards for computers, typewriters had only one type of slash ("/"), normally produced by the unshifted key shared with the question mark. The rise of MS-DOS brought regular use of the backslash ("\") character found on computer keyboards (for specifying directory paths). Before that time the symbol "/" was known simply as a "slash" (US) or "oblique" (UK). (Other typographical names for this character are virgule and solidus. In the UK, the character was traditionally known as an oblique stroke or, more simply, an oblique. To slash means to cut with a scything motion, which is analogous to the motion of the pen as the character is handwritten.)
Freefall bowling
With the widespread deployment of string-based pinsetters in the 2020s, the traditional bowling lanes where the pins have (literally) no strings attached use "freefall" machines.
Free-range parenting
Traditionally children had less supervision prior to the 21st century; this allowed for more independence and freedom in a child's decision making. The term helicopter parenting refers to the opposite, parents who overly monitor, plan, and get involved with their children's activities.
Friction brake
Automotive disc brake or drum brake. Coined after the advent of the regenerative brake in electric or hybrid automobiles.
Frizzen
This component was called the "hammer" while flintlock firearms were in use. On percussion cap firearms which replaced flintlock the striking component was called the hammer and the term frizzen was applied to the hammer of flintlocks.
Frutiger Aero
A skeuomorph-heavy user interface design trend from the 2000s, named after a combination of the Frutiger typeface and Windows Aero.
Full service
A radio format that consists of a wide range of programming. Coined after the introduction of contemporary hit radio in the 1950s.
Full service
Used to refer to services provided by an attendant, as opposed to being done by the customer in a modern self-service environment, such as pumping gasoline, selecting merchandise and using store machinery. In areas where health laws or other regulations prohibit self-service at gas stations, full service includes "extra" services such as checking under the hood and cleaning the windshield, once considered standard services.
Full-size van (US)
Coined after the introduction of minivans by the Big Three automakers, although box trucks (bigger vehicles that were considered vans) existed prior to the Big Three's use of full-size van.
Game Boy Classic
Used to distinguish the original from the Game Boy Pocket, the Game Boy Color, and the Game Boy Advance.
Game Boy Mono
see Game Boy Classic. Refers to the monochrome graphics these models produced.
Gen I (Chevrolet Small Block) Used to distinguish versions of the Chevrolet V6 and V8 engine from the 1997–present LS engines.
GM "old-look" transit bus
The GM old look did not originally have a name, but in 1959, a new design was released and was called the new look. After this many people started calling the older design the Old Look.
Ground warfare
The "Ground war" term/phrase developed some time after the widespread adoption of large scale use of aircraft as a viable weapon of war.
Hand-barrow
Originally, "barrows" suspended the load on poles carried by two people, one in front and one behind. "Wheelbarrows" are first cited by the Oxford English Dictionary to the 14th century, and in the 15th century the term hand-barrow arose to refer to the older sort of barrow, but in the British Isles the more common version was sedan chair (if a person was being carried).
Hand grenade
All grenades were hand-thrown until the invention of the rifle grenade, and, later, the grenade launcher.
Handwritten
Crops up in the late 19th century to contrast with "typewritten".
Hard cider
In Europe and Asia, "cider" refers to fermented (alcoholic) apple juice. In the U.S., "cider" or "apple cider" often refers to unfiltered non-alcoholic apple juice. "Hard cider" specifies the alcoholic version.
Hardcover book
Prior to the invention of paperbacks, all books were hardcover and simply referred to as "books".
Hard disk
All disks were hard (i.e. constructed of rigid instead of flexible magnetic material) until the advent of the floppy disk.
High-floor
All buses and trams were high-floor until the advent of low-floor trams and low-floor and low-entry buses.
Horse cavalry
Used to distinguish the now mostly obsolete original use of horses in a military mounted combat role, with the advent of tanks and other motorized vehicles (mechanized cavalry or armored cavalry) following World War I, and the use of helicopters (air cavalry) during the Vietnam War era.
Horsecar (Horse Tram in English speaking countries outside North America)
Used to describe the horse-pulled predecessor of the modern streetcar / tram. Originally called 'street cars' or just 'cars'. After street railway companies started electrifying their systems around 1900, the term became 'electric street cars' or 'electric trams', to differentiate from the previous horse-drawn vehicles. As time went on the word 'electric' was dropped, and as automobiles began being referred to as cars, the term 'streetcar'(US) or 'tram'(UK) remained to describe a public transit vehicle that ran on rails at street level
Hot chocolate
In the days before the invention of sweet solid chocolate for eating, the word "chocolate" was usually used to refer to the drink. For a while after the chocolate bar was invented it was referred to as "bar chocolate", but due to its rise in popularity in the latter half of the 19th century it eventually laid claim to the basic word.
House call
Although the term was first used in 1899, it was not in common use until the 1960s, when doctors were phasing out coming to patients' homes.
Human computer
Until mechanical computers, and later electronic computers became commercially available, the term "computer", in use from the mid-17th century, meant "one who computes": a person performing mathematical calculations. Teams of people were frequently used to undertake long and often tedious calculations; the work was sometimes divided so that this could be done in parallel.

=== I–L ===
iBook G3
Originally sold as the iBook, these machines were renamed the iBook G3 after the release of the iBook G4.

- iBook Clamshell : Originally sold as the iBook, the machine was nicknamed the Clamshell after Apple released the iBook G3 Snow.
- iBook G3 Snow : Just like its predecessor, the machine was originally sold as the iBook before being nicknamed the iMac G3 Snow by Apple so the name could be used on the iBook G4.

id Tech 3 engine
A name applied to the Quake III Arena engine. Later game engines by id Software used the "id Tech" nomenclature, beginning with id Tech 5.
iMac

- iMac G3 : Originally sold as the iMac, the machine was renamed the iMac G3 by Apple so the name could be used on the iMac G4.
- iMac G4 : Just like its predecessor, the machine was originally sold as the iMac before being renamed the iMac G4 by Apple so the name could be used on the iMac G5.
- iMac G5 : Just like its predecessors, the machine was originally sold as the iMac before being renamed the iMac G5 by Apple so the name could be used on the Intel-based iMac.

Independent bookstore
All bookstores were independent until the advent of bookstore chains.
Indiana Jones and the Raiders of the Lost Ark
Originally released as Raiders of the Lost Ark in 1981. By 2000, the film was marketed as Indiana Jones and the Raiders of the Lost Ark for consistency with other titles in the Indiana Jones franchise.
Indoor volleyball
Used to differentiate from beach volleyball after the latter gained prominence.
Industry Standard Architecture (ISA)
Originally referred to as the PC bus (8-bit) or AT bus (16-bit), it was also termed I/O Channel by IBM. The ISA term was coined as a retronym by IBM PC clone manufacturers in the late 1980s or early 1990s after the release of the 32 bit Extended Industry Standard Architecture (EISA), which was released after IBM's attempts to replace the AT bus with its new and incompatible Micro Channel architecture.
iPhone 2G
Used to differentiate the original 2007 model of the iPhone from its later models.
IPhone OS 1
when it released, marketing material referred to it as a version of Mac OS X running on the iPhone, and the iTunes installer referred to it generically as iPhone software, though with later versions starting with iPhone OS 2, it became retroactively known as iPhone OS 1.0 or iOS 1.
King's Quest: Quest for the Crown
The 1983 game was originally titled King's Quest until the fifth rerelease in 1987 when the subtitle was added to the box art, instructions, and all other materials. This was done to prevent confusion with the sequels which were already on the market.
Lakeshore Corridor
When it opened in 1903, the South Shore Line operated as a single rail line from Chicago to South Bend. A new branch line, the Monon Corridor opened in 2026; "South Shore Line" now refers to the whole system while the original main line is now named the Lakeshore Corridor.
Landline phone service
With the advent of cellular or mobile phone services, traditional hard-wired phone service became popularly known as landline phones. Previously, this term was generally only used by military personnel and amateur radio operators. (In the movie The Matrix a landline phone was also referred to as a "hardline".) Even though a considerable amount of landline phone traffic is transmitted via airwaves, this term comes from the physical cabling that provides the "last mile" connection between the customer premises and local phone distribution centers. Because of the communications industry's love for acronyms, landline phone service has also been called POTS—Plain Old Telephone Service. The logical complement of this acronym, "PANS" became a backronym for "Pretty Amazing New Services". In the telecommunications industry the term wireline is used for landline phone services, to distinguish them from wireless or mobile phone services. Wireline is clearly another retronym.
LED mouse
Before laser mice came along, all optical mice employed LEDs.
Led Zeppelin I
Led Zeppelin's first album was the self-titled Led Zeppelin; it is sometimes called Led Zeppelin I because their subsequent albums were called Led Zeppelin II and Led Zeppelin III.
Linear television
Before the rise of video on demand, video hosting services, streaming media, and digital video recorders, the only way to consume television was through watching television channels, on broadcast, cable or satellite, which showed a combination of both live and recorded programming at designated times.
Live action
A form of a film that consists of images consisting of predominantly actual actors and objects that exist in the actual world, as opposed to an animated film, which predominantly consists of artificial static images or objects that take advantage of the persistence of vision principle of film to give an illusion of life.
Live poker
What casinos call the kind of poker played with cards by people sitting at a table; what many others still just call "poker"; also called a "ring game" or "cash game". The term became necessary to distinguish it from video poker, which is far more common in casinos today.
Live music
Before the introduction of recorded music, there was no need to distinguish a live performance from a recorded one.
Live band dance
Before the advent of DJs (and then automated playlists), all dances had live music.
Luggable computer
The first generation of computers marketed as "portable", such as the Kaypro or the Osborne series, were quite bulky and were heavier than a bowling ball. The weight was mostly because they had a conventional CRT-type monitor built in. When the first laptop computers came out, the earlier, heavier portable machines became referred to as "luggables".

=== M–P ===
Macintosh 128k
Originally named the Macintosh, changed to distinguish from the Macintosh 512k.
Madden 89, 90, 91
All three were known as "John Madden Football" before year numbers were added to the title in subsequent editions.
Mainframe computer
When minicomputers (which were the size and shape of a desk or credenza) were introduced in the early 1970s, existing systems that often consisted of multiple large racks of equipment received the name "mainframe", alluding to the vertical cabinets or "frames" in which they were installed.
Manual transmission (also standard transmission)
Automotive transmissions were all manual before the invention of the automatic transmission.
Meatspace or "meat life" or "real life"
All of physical reality, as distinguished from cyberspace.
Mechanical disk
Before the advent of solid-state ram, and later solid-state flash memory (i.e. no moving parts), all computer disks had moving parts, hence the "mechanical" adjective. These include hard disks, floppy disks, and optical disks (CD-ROMs and DVD-ROMs).
Mechanical fuel injection
The amount of fuel squirted into an internal combustion engine by a fuel injection system was, before integrated circuitry became applied to motor vehicle engines, originally regulated by a calibrated mechanical linkage. What made for the retronym was the more precise Electronic Fuel Injection, which employed more sensors.
Mechanical mouse
before the optical mouse was introduced, all computer mice had a mechanical ball.
Mechanical watch
Prior to the introduction of the first quartz movement watches in the late 1960s, all watches used a mechanical movement.
Microsoft Edge Legacy
Referring to its first iteration that used Microsoft's proprietary EdgeHTML engine, from the Chromium-based counterpart that was released in December 2018.
Middle Ages
The period in European history from the 5th to the 15th century A. D. The earliest use of the term Middle Ages is recorded in 1604, to differentiate that period from the era of Antiquity and the then-beginning age of Modernity.
Minecraft: Java Edition
The original release of the game, on Microsoft Windows, was simply known as Minecraft prior to the release of Minecraft: Windows 10 Edition. In addition, other versions of the video game on Microsoft Windows are Minecraft Classic, Minecraft 4k, and Minecraft: Education Edition.
Monaural sound, monophonic sound or mono sound
Often simplified to simply "mono". Before stereo sound was introduced, mono sound was just called sound.
Muzzleloader
For centuries virtually all firearms were loaded from the muzzle, so there was no need for a term to distinguish this characteristic until the general adoption of breech-loading firearms in the 19th century.
Narrow-body aircraft
An aircraft arranged along a single aisle permitting up to 6-abreast seating in a cabin below 4 metres (13 ft) of width. Before the arrival of wide-body aircraft in the early 1970s, narrow-body aircraft was just called aircraft.
Natural person
To distinguish humans (the original "persons") from the legal fiction of "juridical persons", non-human entities treated like people in law.
Naturally aspirated engines
Internal combustion engines that use vacuum and venturi effect to draw the air and fuel mixture into the cylinders, without fuel injection, turbo-charger, or supercharger.
Oil lamp
Before the invention of kerosene lamps and electric lamps in the 19th century, all lamps were oil lamps.
Old Nintendo 3DS
Used to refer to the original models of the Nintendo 3DS before the release of the New Nintendo 3DS in 2014.
Old Labour
Term used in the 1990s and 2000s to refer to the policies the UK Labour Party was perceived to have held before Tony Blair's leadership, policies previously referred to simply as "Labour".
Old Look
A type of transit bus, which gained this name after the introduction of the New Look bus. Both were made by GM
Old Testament
In the Jewish tradition, the Hebrew Bible is known as the Tanakh.
Open captions
After the introduction of closed caption decoders in the early 1980s and before decoder chips in TV sets became standard in the mid-1990's, TV stations would occasionally add captions to broadcasts which were visible to everyone and could not be turned off, oftentimes for foreign language programming.
Open sewer
Before enclosed pipes, or underground corridors for sewers came along, all sewers were open. For instance, the open sewers in the Middle Ages were largely responsible for The Black Death.
Optical zoom
The advent of digital cameras (and accompanying digital zoom) necessitated this retronym, describing the "analog" method of achieving close-up using a zoom lens.
Opposite-sex marriage
coined after the advent of same-sex marriage.
Organic farming, organic food
Farming practiced without the use of artificial fertilizers, pesticides, and so forth; and the food so produced.
Over-the-board chess (also OTB chess)
Chess played in real time using a physical chessboard, as opposed to computer chess or correspondence chess.
Overground train
Used in the UK to refer to trains that run above ground throughout, as opposed to Underground trains which only run partly overground. (The key distinction is that "Overground" trains are not fully integrated into the Underground system.)
Paid-for sales, pure sales
since the introduction of streaming into chart compilation, with (as in the UK singles chart) a certain number of streams often being added together to make a streaming sale, traditional sales of music (whether in physical or digital format) are now often referred to by these terms.
Pai Gow tiles
Before pai gow poker was created in 1985, the original game with dominoes was simply called pai gow. Pai gow poker is significantly more popular than pai gow played with dominoes so this qualifier is used.
Paleoconservative
Before the advent of the neoconservative movement in the 1970s and its breakthrough success in the 1990s, American conservatism was largely defined by what would be referred to in the 2000s as paleoconservatism.
Pararescue jumper
The term Pararescue jumper is a retronym of the initials "PJ", which were used on Air Force Form 5 (Aircrew Flight Log) to identify anyone on board in order to jump from the aircraft. Pararescuemen originally had no "in flight" duties, and were listed only as "PJ" on the Form 5. The Pararescue position eventually grew to include duties as an aerial gunner and scanner on rotary wing aircraft, a duty now performed by aerial gunners. Currently, aircrew qualified Pararescuemen are recorded using aircrew position identifier "J" ("Pararescue Member") on AFTO form 781.
Paper book
With the popularization of E-books, along with E-readers and tablets to read them in the early 2010s, it became necessary to distinguish books printed on paper from books distributed in a digital form.
Paper copy, hard copy
With the proliferation of exchange of documents in the form of electronic files, physical copies of documents acquired this retronym. Occasionally extended to the copying devices; i.e. paper copiers. The jocular substitute dead-tree copy is sometimes used.
Parallel ATA (PATA)
The original ATA interface was parallel; the qualification became necessary when Serial ATA was introduced.
Peanut butter
Prior to the invention of homogenized peanut butter in the 1920s, all peanut butter was old fashioned or natural, the oil separated and the product required stirring before use. In addition, all peanut butter was creamy or smooth prior to invention of crunchy or chunky peanut butter in the 1920s.
Permanent magnet
Used for an object that is permanently magnetized rather than an electromagnet.
Physical media (data transfer)
Refers to the transmission of data over wires, such as copper cables, fibre optic or coaxial cable, as opposed to wireless communication.
Physical media (media storage)
Refers to the storage of data on physical objects, such as paper, photographs, video tapes, or optical disks, as opposed to cloud storage or streaming media.
Physical single
After the coming of the legal music download, this term became commonplace to refer to a vinyl, CD or cassette single, which would previously have been referred to simply as a "single".
Pikmin 1
Given to the Nintendo Switch remaster of Pikmin (2001), alongside the remaster of Pikmin 2 (2004).
Pipe organ
Before smaller reed-based organs and harmoniums were invented, every organ used large pipes.
PlayStation 1 or PS1
to distinguish from the PlayStation 2 and its subsequent successors (PS3, PS4, and PS5). A smaller version of the original PlayStation was named the PS one, released shortly after the PS2.
Pokémon: Indigo League
Name given in DVD releases and streaming services for the first season of the Pokémon anime series; it originally aired simply as Pokémon.
PowerPC G1
Originally called the PowerPC 601, the processor was nicknamed the G1 after Apple used the G3, G4, and the G5 names to refer to the PowerPC 7xx, PowerPC 74xx, and PowerPC 970 respectively.
PowerPC G2
Originally called the PowerPC 603, the processor was nicknamed the G2 after Apple used the G3, G4, and the G5 names to refer to the PowerPC 7xx, PowerPC 74xx, and PowerPC 970 respectively.
Primordial element and Transient element
Elements that are found in nature, as opposed to those that have to be created in the lab using a collider.
Post sedan or post coupe
In the United States this indicates a car with a full-height B-pillar, as opposed to a pillarless (half-height B-pillar) hardtop. Generally used only in referring to classic cars from the 1950 to 1980 period because fashion and safety regulations dictate nearly all modern cars are post models.
Pragmaticism
In 1905, in order to differentiate his original version from more recent forms of Pragmatism, Charles Sanders Peirce renamed his version to Pragmaticism, a term "ugly enough to be safe from kidnappers".
Pre-dreadnought battleship
The revolution in battleship design brought about by the construction of HMS Dreadnought resulted in almost all the battleships built before her completion becoming known as "pre-Dreadnought battleships", whereas before they had simply been "battleships".
Primary cell
Also, less formally non-rechargeable battery; Before the introduction of rechargeable batteries, all cells were primary, then when rechargeable batteries came along (lead-acid battery being the first), rechargeable batteries would formally be called "secondary cells".
Prime lens
A camera lens with a fixed focal length (e.g. 28 mm), as opposed to a zoom lens, which can cover a range of focal lengths (e.g. 28–105 mm). Before the invention of zoom lenses, all camera lenses had a fixed focal length, so they were just called "lenses".
Procedural programming
Before object-oriented programming was invented in the 1980s, there was just programming.
Prop airplane
As jet aircraft became the primary people movers of the airways, the older propeller-based technology received this occasional shorthand nickname to distinguish it.
Pulse dialing
After touch tone dialing on telephones became common, the older dialing standard became known as pulse dialing.

=== R–Z ===
Raw milk
Also called fresh milk, refers to milk that has not been pasteurized, a process which did not become standard until the 1800s
Real numbers
Coined after the development of the imaginary numbers.
Real mode
Before protected mode had been introduced in the 80286 processor, the term "real mode" was not in use for MS-DOS memory management.
Real tennis
Was once known simply as tennis, but came into use at the end of the 19th century to distinguish it from the game of lawn tennis patented in 1874. The term "real tennis" has become more vague now since video game tennis has come along. Therefore, real tennis is now court tennis.
The Real World: Los Angeles
The second season of The Real World, it was called The Real World: California when first aired; the name was changed to account for later seasons that took place elsewhere in California.
The Real World: New York
The first season of the show, it was simply called The Real World when first aired.
Red Book audio CD
At first, all audio CDs complied with the Red Book standard. Then came other implementations of the audio CD, such as Super Audio CD, MP3 CDs, and DVD-Audio, and the original is now referred to as Red Book audio to differentiate between different standards.
Red panda or lesser panda
Were known as pandas in the English language, prior to the discovery and naming of the Giant Panda on the year 1869.
Reel-to-reel or open reel
Tape recorders were originally simply tape recorders, as they all used a pair of open reels to hold the magnetic recording medium. The term reel-to-reel was introduced when various forms of cassette tape formats became popular.
Reflective liquid crystal display
before LCDs had backlighting, all LCDs required the reflection of room light or sunlight in order to see the screen.
Regular Nintendo
A colloquial nickname for the original Nintendo Entertainment System (NES) coined when Super Nintendo Entertainment System (Super NES) was introduced to the market.
Rotary telephone or dial telephone
The kind of telephone in common use before touch-tone telephones.
Rugby union
To differentiate it from its descendant, rugby league. Like hockey, the original term of rugby is still widespread.
Scalar processors
As opposed to Vector processors.
Scripted series
Created in the wake of the success of reality television, the term applies to both fiction and non-fiction television with an identified writer or writers. The term can be misleading since reality television is almost never wholly improvised and often includes writing of some kind.
Seventy-eight (78) rpm records
Before the advent of 33 1/3 rpm and 45 rpm vinyl records, these were known simply as records, phonograph records or gramophone records.
short file name
(Officially referred to as 8.3 filename) before the advent of long filenames. FAT file systems only had 11 characters, three of which form the extension. The ISO 9660 filesystem for CD-ROMs has similar specifications to conform to the FAT specs.
Shovel Knight: Shovel of Hope
Refers to the 2014 video game originally known as Shovel Knight. For the game's 2017 Nintendo Switch release, the game was given the subtitle to make it more consistent with its included DLC campaigns. The overall package was renamed to Shovel Knight: Treasure Trove.
Silent film
In the earliest days of the film industry, all films were without recorded sound. Once "talkies" became the norm, it became necessary to specify that a particular film was "silent". The term "silent film" is also a misnomer, because silent films were typically presented in theatres with live musical accompaniment.
Sit-down restaurant
With the rise of fast-food and take-out restaurants, the "standard" restaurant received a new name in the United States. (In the United Kingdom, fast food and takeaway (takeout) outlets are not normally referred to as "restaurants", so the "sit-down" qualifier is not necessary.)
SLED (Single Large Expensive Disk)
The redundant array of inexpensive disks (RAID) strategy for computer memory storage, introduced in the late 1980s was contrasted with the older standard, a single large expensive disk, or SLED.
Smart Fortwo
Originally sold as the Smart City-Coupé, the car was renamed the Fortwo upon the release of the Smart Forfour.
Snail mail (also known as land mail, paper mail, p-mail, and postal mail)
Non-electronic mail delivered to physical locations, such as one's home or business. Before email and voice mail, all mail was physical, and much slower by comparison – thus, the dysphemistic "snail" appellation. Compare surface mail, below.
Sneakernet
Before the Internet became popular, the so-called "sneakernet" was simply just a regular transfer of computer data on physical, interchangeable media. For instance, punched tape was used for this purpose at first, then floppy disks, then sneakernet was coined when the Internet became popular, now modern sneakernets involve transfer of Secure digital cards, USB flash drives, external hard drives, optical disks (CDs, DVDs, Blu-rays), etc.
Snow skiing
Water skiing now necessitates this differentiation. This, however, only applies to an area where both "snow" as well as "water" skiing are likely. "Snow skiing" would not be mentioned in the Alpine regions, unless large lakes offered the availability of water skiing.
Solid-propellant rocket
Refers to rockets that use a solid propellant such as gunpowder or RDX; liquid-propellant rockets were invented in the mid-20th century.
Solo motorcycle
So called instead of motorcycle when some were being built with a sidecar.
Sourdough
Before other approaches to leavening bread were used, all bread dough was at least partially "sour".
Special relativity
Term introduced after Einstein developed general relativity.
standard AUX input (standard auxiliary input)
The common name for AUX audio inputs that doesn't employ an iPod dock connector, USB, optical/coaxial S/PDIF digital audio or proprietary mechanical standards that employ multiple standards alongside proprietary audio signaling standards. It usually refers to 1/8th inch TRS connectors, but sometimes it can refer to a set of red and white RCA stereo jacks.
Star Trek: The Original Series
The series' actual title Star Trek is now often used to refer collectively to the original series and its multitude of spin-offs.
Star Wars: Episode IV – A New Hope
Originally released in 1977 under the title Star Wars. The new title was applied to a 1979 publication of the script and (following the 1980 release of Star Wars: Episode V – The Empire Strikes Back) to a 1981 amended re-release of the original film.
Static electricity
see triboelectricity, below.
Steam train
In the 19th century, before the advent of electric and diesel-powered trains, steam trains were just "trains".
Strike-anywhere match
After the development of the safety match, that could only be lit by striking a custom surface containing phosphorus, the older non-safety matches were still in demand.
Studio recording, studio album
Before live albums, music for distribution on records was only recorded in a studio.
Super Mario Bros. 93
The first Super Mario Bros. movie to be released outside of Japan came out in 1993. It was the first Super Mario movie to be advertised to the mainstream, despite its failure in the box office. When The Super Mario Bros. Movie came out in 2023, 30 years after, this necessitated referring to the live action movie by its release year of 1993.
Super Mario Bros.: The Lost Levels
In 1986, the first sequel to the hit NES game Super Mario Bros. was released in Japan as Super Mario Bros. 2. Because of its extreme difficulty and similarity to its predecessor, Nintendo of America opted not to release the game in North America. Instead, Nintendo released a remake of Yume Kōjō: Doki Doki Panic as the North American Super Mario Bros. 2 in 1988. The original sequel was eventually rereleased worldwide as part of the Super Mario All-Stars compilation, but under the moniker Super Mario Bros.: The Lost Levels. Outside of Japan, this name persists to avoid confusion with the North American sequel.
Super Mario USA
When the American Super Mario Bros. 2 was released in Japan, it was retitled Super Mario USA.
Super Smash Bros. 64
Initially released on the Nintendo 64 as Super Smash Bros., the "64" moniker used in other Nintendo 64 games would be colloquially added to distinguish it from future Super Smash Bros. entries.
Surface mail
Traditional mail, delivered by road, rail, and ship, retrospectively named following the development of airmail. Compare snail mail, above.
Survivor: Borneo
Broadcast as just Survivor. When the show subsequently used other locales, the location of the first season was added to the title to distinguish it.
Terrestrial radio
As opposed to satellite radio.
Terrestrial television
As opposed to satellite television and cable television.
Textile top convertible
Before retractable hardtops became popular, convertibles mostly had textile tops which folded when stowed away for a top-down ride.
Text-only dialogue
Before voice acting became commonplace in video games, text was used to convey dialogue between characters (especially in genres such as RPGs and adventure games). Some games, such as the Yakuza series, still uses text-only dialogue in addition to voice acting, depending on the importance of a cutscene.
Tie-on pocket
Early pockets were pouches, similar to a purse, tied around the waist and worn underneath the wearer's outer garments. Once pockets began to be sewn directly into clothing, these pouch-like pockets needed to be differentiated from those that had been integrated into the garment.
Transformers: Generation 1
referring to the original Transformers toyline which ran from 1984 to 1992, and the assorted tie-in media. Then known only as "The Transformers", when the sequel series, Transformers: Generation 2 launched by Hasbro in 1993, all previous subject matter was dubbed "Generation 1" – many individuals did this independently, as it is a logical progression, and when the online fandom began growing in the 1990s, the term became the definitive one for that era. The term subsequently made it into official use through toy reissues and comic books, most notably on Japanese toy packaging.
Triboelectricity
Electricity was so named from the Greek word for amber, because of the discovery that if it was rubbed (generating what is now called triboelectricity) it would attract objects (due to a charge of static electricity). Electric currents and other forms of generation were discovered later.
Tube amplifier
Tube amplifiers for musical instruments were largely replaced by "transistor" (or solid state) amplifiers during the 1960s and 1970s.
Tube TV or CRT TV
Originally, all televisions used a cathode ray tube (CRT) to produce a TV image. But once technologies like the LCD became mainstream, distinguishing televisions as CRT or Tube-based became necessary.
Two-door coupe
Before four-door cars started to have coupe-like styling in recent years, coupes mostly referred to 2-door cars. Examples of 4-door cars that have used coupe as a marketing term are the BMW X6 SUV and the Dodge Charger sedan which reuses the name of a 1970s 2-door car.
Ultimate Doom
Before Doom II, Ultimate Doom was originally just simply Doom. Doom was originally just a mail-order game, then when Doom II sold successfully in stores, Doom was re-released as a retail product, it was dubbed Ultimate Doom to differentiate from Doom II. It added a new episode called Thy Flesh Consumed.
Uncontrolled road (or uncontrolled highway)
Before the concept of controlled-access roads, which some call expressways came along, even predating automobiles, all roads had direct access to private property or public event or government grounds. When the controlled-access roads came along, they helped to virtually eliminate direct driveway access to private property or parking lots with only select crossroads for direct access. One had to use the term uncontrolled road to differentiate. However, the introduction of freeways (which other countries referred to as autoroutes, motorways and whatnot) further complicated matters by necessitating the use of the term at-grade expressway (see above). Recent uncontrolled roads have even adopted qualities of freeways and expressways such as paved shoulders (sometimes with rumble strips), freeway speed limits, and grade-separated ramp junctions (though most are just the at-grade "guest" of diamond junctions).
Unstyled John Deere tractor
After industrial design was applied to the sheet metal styling of John Deere tractors, the distinction unstyled was retronymously applied to earlier models whose model name was the same, for example, styled Model A versus unstyled Model A
Upright bicycle
The advent of the Recumbent bicycle sometimes requires a speaker to make the distinction between that and the conventional "upright bicycle".
Vanilla Doom
The advent of source ports for Doom have altered gameplay behavior.
Viennese waltz
The original waltz, as distinct from other styles of waltz that have since developed.
Visible light
Before the discovery of invisible wavelengths of electromagnetic radiation, all light was considered visible.
Water-activated stamps (gummed stamps)
The predominant kind of postage stamp before self-adhesive stamps became popular.
Water ice
Used in some scientific contexts, to refer to water in the solid state (in any form), as opposed to any volatiles (carbon dioxide, methane, argon) in their solid state. Ordinary ice in everyday contexts is specifically hexagonal Ice I_{h}.
Web 1.0
a term used from the mid-2000s onward to refer to the World Wide Web / Internet of the 1990s and early 2000s. At the time, it was referred to simply as "the web" or (less accurately) "the internet" or "the net".
Wet signature
a term used in business when a hard copy with the person actually signing the document is what is required. This term came into fashion as computers became more adept at actually inserting a picture of a person's signature into documents without any real indication that it had been "pasted." Some refer to this as an original signature.
Whole milk
Milk was formerly available in just one version, with the cream included, and benefited eventually by pasteurization and homogenization. But it was still called simply milk. This variety of milk is now referred to in the U.S. as whole milk (3.25% milkfat) to distinguish it from 2% (reduced fat) milk, 1% (low fat) milk, and skim milk (nearly no fat). In the UK, the terms whole milk (also full-cream milk or full-fat milk) (3.5%), semi-skimmed milk (about 1.5%) and skimmed milk (almost no fat) are commonly used.
Whole wheat
All flour, bread, pasta, etc. consisted of some combination of endosperm, germ and bran before white flour was created in the mid 19th century and became the more dominant variant when referring to flour.
Win16
The original, 16-bit Windows API, as distinguished from the newer Win32 and Win64.
Zune 30
Used to describe the first-generation Zune device; the "30" was added after the release of the Zune 4, 8, and 80

== Geographic retronyms ==
Proper names
These are proper names for the described regions, or corridors.

Abandoned Pennsylvania Turnpike
A section of the Pennsylvania Turnpike between Breezewood and Hustontown which was bypassed by a new alignment that bypassed the tunnels because it was too costly to blast away more rock to widen the travel lanes.
Asia Minor
The name Asia was first applied to the mainland east of the Aegean islands, and later extended to the greater landmass of which that is a peninsula.
Baja California
The name California was first applied to the peninsula (thought to be an island) now known as Baja ("Lower"), and later extended – and then restricted – to Alta ("Upper") California, and finally to the current U.S. state.
East Indies
After Columbus landed in the West Indies.
East Prussia
Prussia began as a duchy in the kingdom of Poland. As the highest-ranking dignity of the Hohenzollern dynasty, the name came to be applied to their territories stretching across Germany. The name East Prussia became more significant when it was separated from the rest of Prussia and Germany by the Polish Corridor.
EUxx
"EU" followed by two digits is often used in statistics to indicate the different makeup of the European Union

- EU12: the twelve-member EU as founded in 1993; most of the Western European nations
- EU15: the fifteen-member EU after Austria, Finland and Sweden joined in 1995
- EU25: the EU from 2004 to 2007 after ten eastern and central European nations joined
- EU27: the EU from 2007 to 2013, after Romania and Bulgaria were added
- EU28: the EU from 2013 to 2020, after Croatia joined
- EU27 is now used to refer to the EU after the United Kingdom left in 2020; it was also used after the 2016 Brexit referendum to refer to "the EU countries less the UK" as they negotiated with the UK government

First Chinatown
First Chinatown refers to Toronto's original Chinatown at Dundas and Elizabeth Streets in The Ward, and was known as such until the construction of the new city hall and public square in the 1960s. Most stores that occupied the construction project was cleared through expropriation. The resulting development caused the westward relocation of Chinatown to its current location at Dundas Street and Spadina Avenue.
Great Britain
Britons fleeing the Germanic invasions settled in Armorica which became Brittany or Little Britannia.
Lower Saxony
The kingdom and duchies of Saxony are outside the original lowland territory of the Saxon people.
Manhattan Chinatown
For a long time, New York City had only one Chinatown. However, there are now large Chinese communities in Flushing, Queens and Sunset Park, Brooklyn, and thus, a need has developed to differentiate among the city's three Chinatowns.
Old Chinatown
London's original Chinatown (destroyed in The Blitz) was in Limehouse; the new Chinatown is in Soho. Also used in Houston, Texas, to the Chinatown district located east of the George R. Brown Convention Center and south of BBVA/Compass Stadium.
Old Toronto
Old Toronto refers to the old City of Toronto, prior to the amalgamation of Toronto in 1998. In 1998, the Government of Ontario dissolved the regional municipality of Metropolitan Toronto, as well as the region's constituent municipalities (including Old Toronto). The former municipalities that made up Metropolitan Toronto were amalgamated into a single entity, the present-day city of Toronto.
Old World
After Columbus landed in the Americas ("The New World").
Old Northwest, Old Southwest and Old West
Regions formerly at these extreme corners of the United States.

=== General descriptions ===
These are less official descriptions that are commonly used.

Contiguous United States or Lower 48
Referred to simply as The United States before Alaska and Hawaii, which are American exclaves, became states.

== Historiographic retronyms ==
Aztec Empire
Term coined by Alexander von Humboldt in the early 19th Century to differentiate between the pre-Hispanic "Mexican empire" and the then new post-Hispanic one (this, in turn, became known as the First Mexican Empire upon the French-backed enthronement of Maximilian I in 1864).
Byzantine Empire
Term coined in 1557 to name the East Roman Empire, then defunct by over a century, in the historical period following the disintegration of the Western Roman Empire in 476 AD. The entity was commonly known as 'Roman Empire' to its inhabitants and 'Greek Empire' to contemporary Western Europeans.
Gran Colombia
Historians' term for the first "Republic of Colombia", which included what are now Colombia, Venezuela, Ecuador, and Panama.
Polish–Lithuanian Commonwealth
Term coined in the 20th century, after the restoration of separate Poland and Lithuania as independent states.
Weimar Republic
Used to refer to the German Reich during the period in which it was a liberal democracy, prior to being taken over by the Nazi Party.
World War I/First World War
Originally this was called "The Great War" and commonly believed to be "the war to end all wars". However, when a second war enveloped Europe, Asia, and much of the Pacific, it became necessary to distinguish them. This convention has been used for many series of wars, going back as far as the First Peloponnesian War or earlier. Most recently, the 1991 war in the Persian Gulf, formerly called "Desert Storm" or just the "Gulf War", is now (since the 2003 invasion of Iraq and the 2026 Iran War) often referred to as "The First Gulf War".

== Airports ==
When an airport consists of only one passenger facility, most people just call it "the airport" or "the terminal". However, when an airport expands, it is often necessary to give the original building a retronymic adjective to avoid confusion. While some airports just rename older terminals or concourse with letters or numbers (e.g. Terminal 1 or Concourse B), other methods include:

- Cardinal directions – when Newark opened Terminals A and B in the early 1970s, the existing passenger terminal was renamed the "North Terminal".
- Proper names – Detroit Metro Airport had only one passenger terminal until 1966, when the existing facility was identified as the "L.C. Smith Terminal".
