= Li Guohua =

Chinese politician

- 李国华

General Manager of China Unicom
- In office 19 July 2018 – 11 March 2020
- Chairman: Liu Liehong
- Preceded by: Lu Yimin
- Succeeded by: Chen Zhongyue (陈忠岳)

Chairman of the Postal Savings Bank of China
- In office January 2012 – July 2018
- Preceded by: New title
- Succeeded by: Zhang Jinliang

General Manager of China Post
- In office September 2011 – July 2018
- Preceded by: Liu Andong (刘安东)
- Succeeded by: Zhang Jinliang

Personal details
- Born: March 1960 (age 66) De'an County, Jiangxi, China
- Party: Chinese Communist Party (expelled)
- Education: Jiangxi Post and Telecommunications School; Nanchang University; University of Poitiers; Central Party School of the Chinese Communist Party

Chinese name
- Simplified Chinese: 李国华
- Traditional Chinese: 李國華
Transcriptions
Standard Mandarin
- Hanyu Pinyin: Li Guohua

Li Guohua (Chinese: 李国华; born March 1960) is a retired Chinese business executive who served as general manager of China Unicom from 2018 to 2022, chairman of the Postal Savings Bank of China from 2012 to 2018, and general manager of China Post from 2011 to 2018. He was investigated by China's top anti-graft agency in February 2022 and charged with bribery and abuse of power by the Intermediate People's Court of Qingdao in 2023.

== Early life and education ==
Li was born in De'an County, Jiangxi, in March 1960. In September 1977, he became a sent-down youth in his home-county. In October 1978, he entered Jiangxi Post and Telecommunications School, majoring in signal carrier. He also studied at Nanchang University, Poitiers University and the Central Party School of the Chinese Communist Party as a part-time student.

== Career in postal system ==
After graduating in 1981, he was despatched to the De'an County Post and Telecommunications Administration and one year later was transferred to Jiujiang Post and Telecommunications Bureau, where he eventually became deputy director in May 1992. He joined the Chinese Communist Party (CCP) in November 1983. He became director of Fuzhou Post and Telecommunications Bureau in November 1994, and served until December 1996. In December 1996, he became deputy director of Jiangxi Post Bureau, rising to director in July 1999. In July 2005, he was assigned to deputy director of the State Post Bureau. He served as deputy general manager of China Post in November 2006, and five years later promoted to the general manager position. In January 2021, he concurrently served as chairman of the Postal Savings Bank of China.

== Career in China Unicom ==
On 19 July 2018, he was promoted to become general manager of China Unicom, serving in the post until his retirement on 11 March 2020.

== Downfall ==
On 18 February 2022, he was put under investigation for alleged "serious violations of discipline and laws" by the Central Commission for Discipline Inspection (CCDI), the party's internal disciplinary body, and the National Supervisory Commission, the highest anti-corruption agency of China. On 30 September, he was expelled from the Communist Party. On November 4, the Supreme People's Procuratorate signed an arrest order for him for taking bribes. On November 4, he was arrested for suspected bribery by the Supreme People's Procuratorate.

On July 20, 2023, Li stood trial at the Intermediate People's Court of Qingdao in Shandong. Li was charged with abuse of power and bribery. He took over 66 million yuan in bribes, took advantage of his position to give selective project contracting and job promotion, and caused the loss of over 49 million yuan in state assets. Li pleaded guilty to the charges. On 7 May 2024, the court sentenced Li to 16 years in prison and fined him 6 million yuan.

Business positions
Preceded by Liu Andong (刘安东)	General Manager of China Post; 2011–2018	Succeeded by Zhang Jinliang
New title	Chairman of the Postal Savings Bank of China; 2012–2018	Succeeded by Zhang Jinliang
Preceded by Lu Yimin	General Manager of China Unicom; 2018–2020	Succeeded by Chen Zhongyue (陈忠岳)
