= China National Philatelic Corporation =

Chinese state-owned entity

China National Philatelic Co., Ltd. 中国集邮总公司
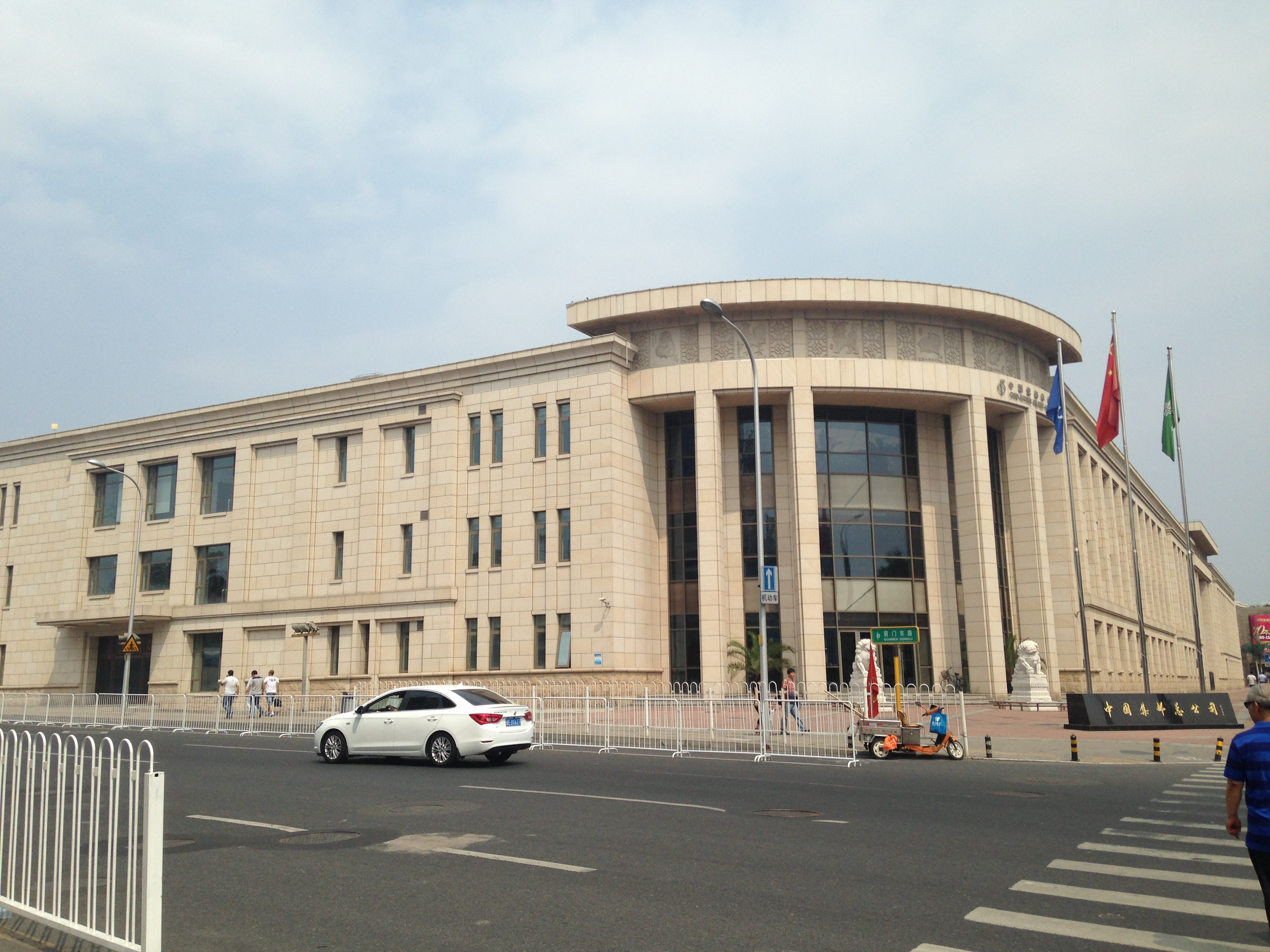
- Type: State-owned
- Industry: Philately
- Founded: 1981
- Headquarters: No. 2 Xuanwumen Dong Avenue, Xuanwu District, Beijing, China
- Products: Stamps, FDCs, MCs, etc.
- Services: Philatelic Services
- Owner: State Council
- Website: cpi.chinapost.com.cn

China National Philatelic Co., Ltd.
- Traditional Chinese: 中國集郵總公司
- Simplified Chinese: 中国集邮总公司
Transcriptions
Standard Mandarin
- Hanyu Pinyin: Zhōngguó Jíyóu Zǒng Gōngsī

The China National Philatelic Corporation (CNPC, Chinese: 中国集邮总公司) is the primary agency authorized by China Post Group Corporation of the PRC to sell national stamps, other philatelic items, and provide other philatelic services to the public. It is a state-owned corporation. CNPC has come under criticism for excessive production of philatelic products.

== See also ==
- State Post Bureau
- China Post
