= China Postal Airlines =

Chinese cargo airline

China Postal Airlines 中国邮政航空; 中國郵政航空; Zhōngguó Yóuzhèng Hángkōng

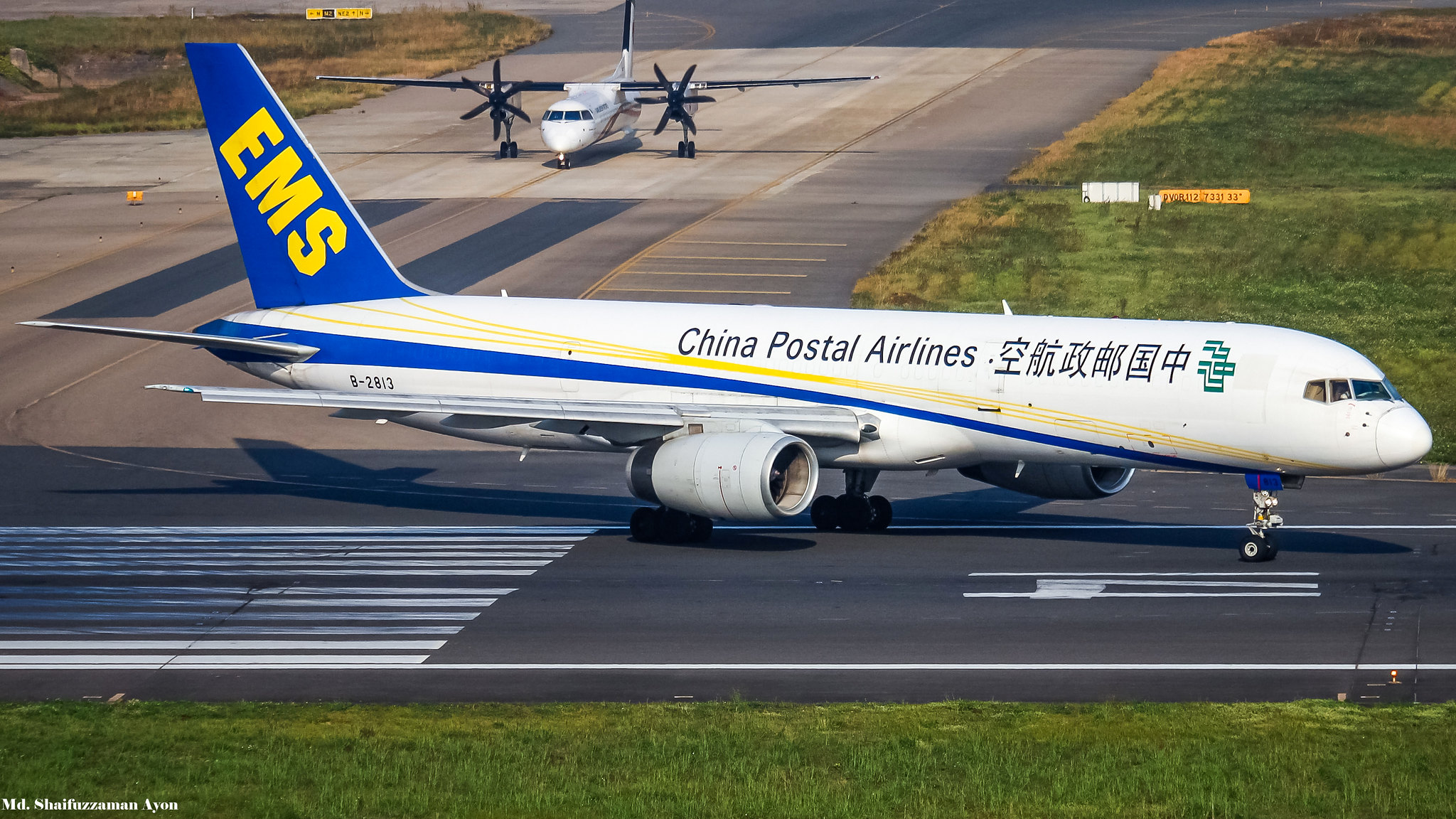
- China Postal Airlines Boeing 757-200PCF
IATA	ICAO	Call sign
CF	CYZ	CHINA POST
- Founded: 25 November 1996; 29 years ago
- Commenced operations: 27 February 1997; 29 years ago
- Hubs: Nanjing Lukou International Airport
- Fleet size: 39
- Parent company: China Post
- Headquarters: Beijing, China
- Website: www.cnpostair.com

China Postal Airlines (Chinese: 中国邮政航空 Zhōngguó Yóuzhèng Hángkōng) is a cargo airline based in the Ziyu Office Building (紫玉写字楼; 紫玉 寫字樓; Zǐyù Xiězìlóu) in Haidian District, Beijing, People's Republic of China. Its main operating base is located at Nanjing Lukou International Airport.

== History ==
The airline was established on 25 November 1996 and began operations on 27 February 1997. It is owned by the Chinese Postal Bureau (51%) and China Southern Airlines (49%). It was originally set up to operate domestic postal services, but in 2006 introduced international scheduled services to South Korea and Japan. From January 2007 international cargo charter services were introduced.

In September 2008, China Post bought all shares of the airline from China Southern, which become a wholly owned subsidiary of China Post.

In December 2015 it was announced that a total of seven used Boeing 757 and ten used Boeing 737 would be acquired from Boeing, being converted to freighters via Boeing's Converted Freighter (BCF) program.

In a Department of Transportation (DOT) filing dated December 16, 2022, the airline stated it intends to use two new Boeing 777Fs on flights between Nanjing and Chicago, and Nanjing and Los Angeles starting from mid 2023. The DOT filing identifies the two 777Fs to be used on the routes as serial numbers B-221X (msn 67763) and B-221Y (msn 67764). The carrier states that it wants to start its Chicago flights in August 2023, and the Los Angeles flights in March 2024. Both services will have a technical stop Ted Stevens International Airport in Anchorage, Alaska.

== Destinations ==
China Postal Airlines operates express mail and cargo transport services mainly for China Post to over 300 domestic destinations, as well as international scheduled and charter services.

== Fleet ==
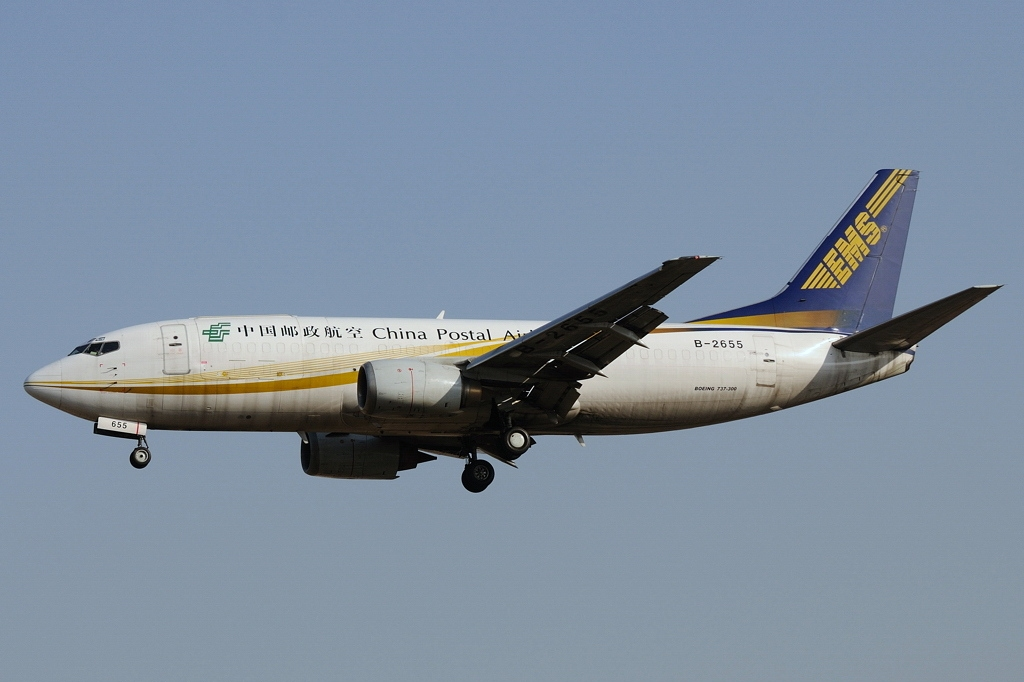
China Postal Airlines Boeing 737-300F

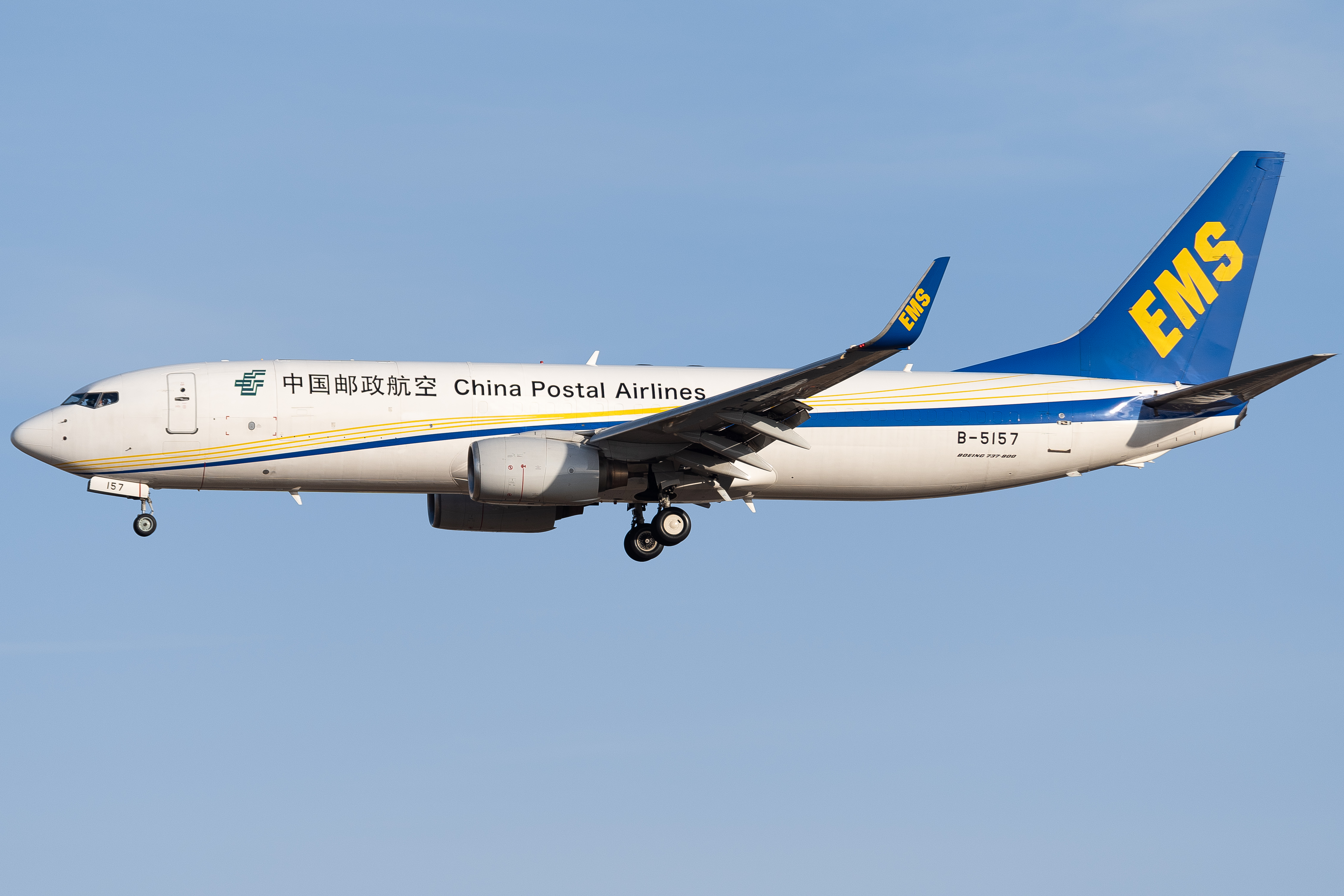
China Postal Airlines Boeing 737-800BCF

As of December 2025, China Postal Airlines operates the following aircraft:

China Postal Airlines fleet
Aircraft	In service	On order
Boeing 737-300SF	6	—
Boeing 737-400SF	4	—
Boeing 737-400BDSF	4	—
Boeing 737-800BCF	18	—
Boeing 757-200PCF	5	—
Boeing 777F	2	—
Total	39	—

== See also ==
- China Post
- China Southern Airlines
