= Postal Savings Bank of China =

Chinese commercial retail bank

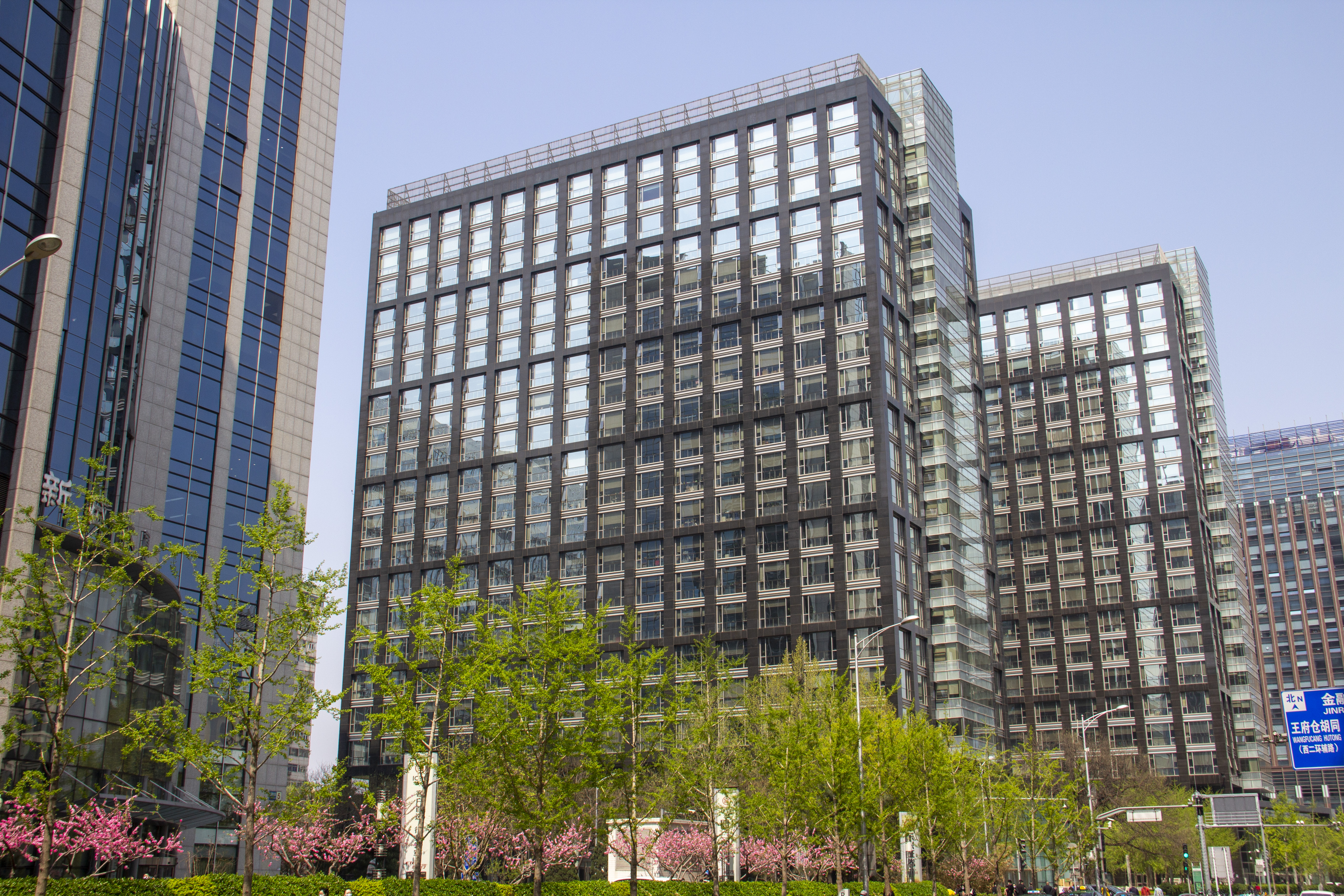
- Headquarters in Beijing, China
- Native name: 中国邮政储蓄银行
- Type: Public (state-owned)
- Traded as: SEHK: 1658 (H share); SEHK: 4612 (H preference; 2017-2022); SSE: 601658 (A share); CSI 300 component
- Founded: 6 March 2007; 19 years ago
- Headquarters: No. 3 Financial Street, Xicheng District, Beijing, PRC
- Key people: Zheng Guoyu (Chairman); Lu Wei (President)
- Revenue: ▲CN¥ 355.866 billion (2025)
- Operating income: ▲CN¥ 98.221 billion (2025)
- Net income: ▲CN¥ 87.623 billion (2025)
- Total assets: ▲CN¥ 18.682067 trillion (2025)
- Total equity: ▲CN¥ 1.384271 trillion (2025)
- Owners: China Post Group (51.87%)
- Number of employees: 196,779 (2025)
- Capital ratio: Tier 1 12.10% (2025)
- Website: www.psbc.com

Postal Savings Bank of China Co., Ltd.
- Simplified Chinese: 中国邮政储蓄银行股份有限公司
- Traditional Chinese: 中國郵政儲蓄銀行股份有限公司
Transcriptions

Postal Savings Bank of China
- Simplified Chinese: 中国邮政储蓄银行
- Traditional Chinese: 中國郵政儲蓄銀行
Transcriptions

Second alternative Chinese name
- Simplified Chinese: 邮储银行
- Traditional Chinese: 郵儲銀行
Transcriptions

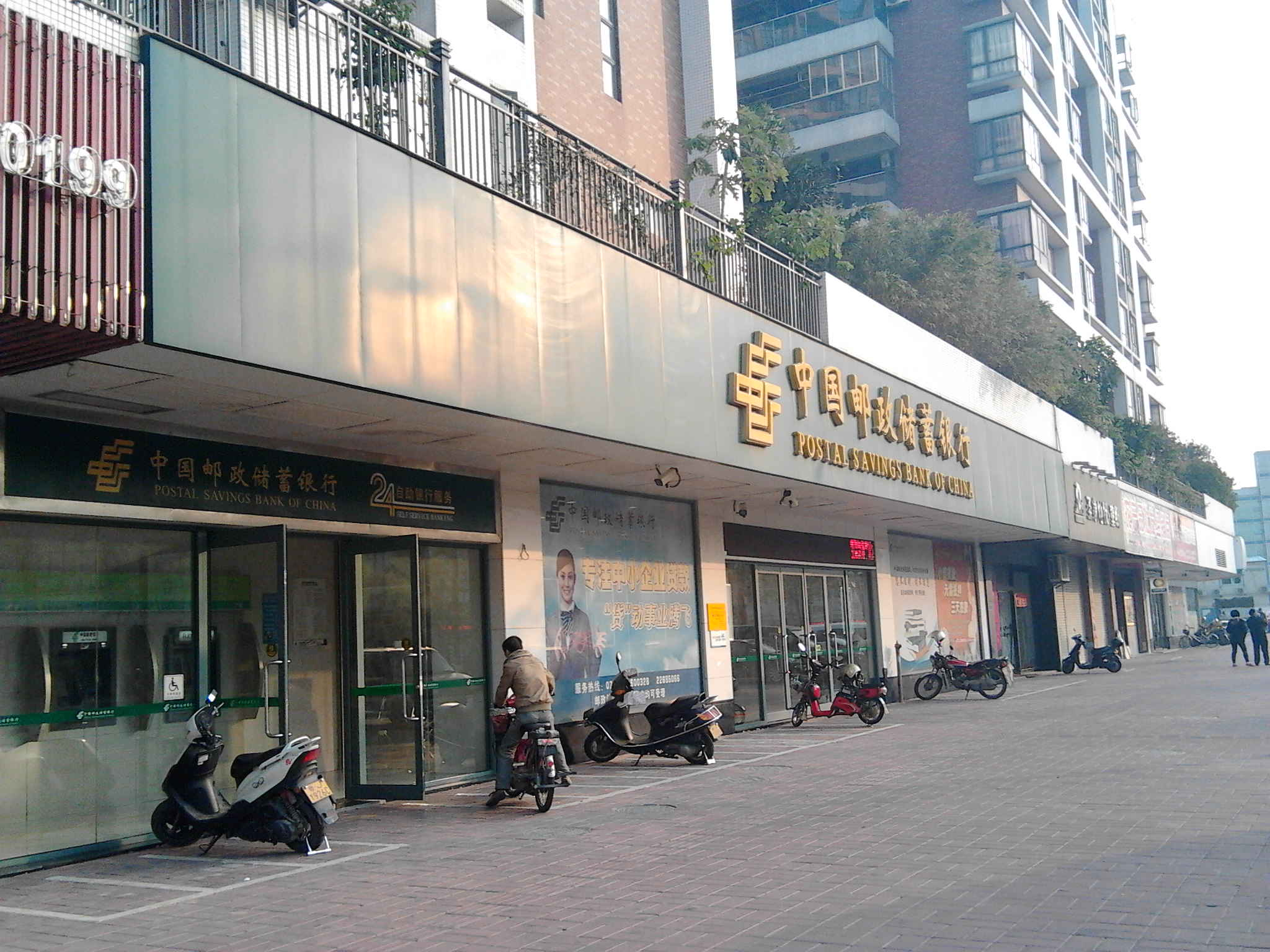
A branch of Postal Savings Bank of China

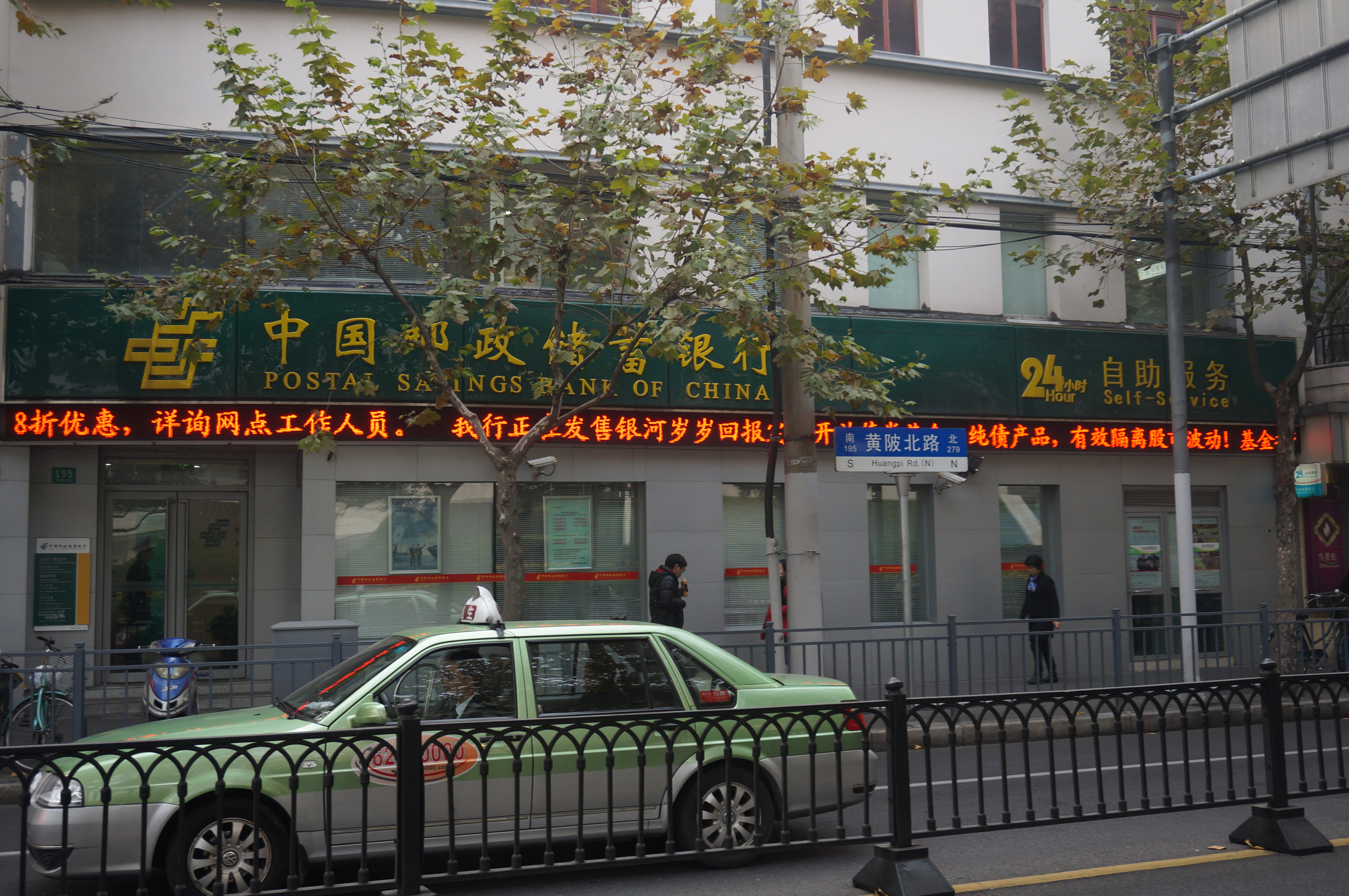
A branch of Postal Savings Bank of China in Shanghai

Postal Savings Bank of China Co., Ltd. also known as PSBC is a Chinese retail bank and financial services corporation headquartered in Beijing, China. PSBC provides basic financial services, especially to small and medium enterprises, rural and low income customers. As of 31 December 2017, PSBC has 39,798 branches covering all regions of China. PSBC was ranked #27 in Forbes Global 2000 in 2023.

PSBC was set up with an initial capital of RMB20 billion in 2007 from the State Post Bureau. Today it has RMB1.5 trillion in deposits and the second largest number of branches, after the Agricultural Bank of China.

During the 2008 financial crisis, the government took several measures to spread its national economic stimulus plan specifically to rural areas. This included using microfinance services provided by the Postal Savings Bank as a tool for national development and poverty reduction. The bank with its extremely broad reach also assists China's credit cooperatives in their microcredit schemes.

On 8 December 2015, China Postal Savings Bank, through issuing pro-float stock, received an injection of investment from the Temasek Holdings of Singapore, UBS, the Canada Pension Plan Investment Board, the International Finance Corporation, Morgan Stanley, DBS Bank, Tencent, Ant Financial Services Group, China Life and China Telecom, with a total investment of 45.1 billion yuan. These "strategic investors" together held a 16.92% stake in the company at the time of purchase. The stock was listed through an initial public offering on the Stock Exchange of Hong Kong on 30 September 2016. Prior to its listing, it was the largest unlisted Chinese bank.

== Commerce ==
Postal Savings Bank of China focuses on serving "agriculture, rural areas, and farmers", small and medium-sized enterprises, and urban and rural residents. The bank leverages its postal network, ensuring stable operations, compliance, and good risk control to provide quality financial services, maximize shareholder value, and contribute to socio-economic development.

By the end of 2016, Postal Savings Bank of China had total assets of RMB 8.27 trillion, deposit balance of RMB 7.29 trillion, and total loans of RMB 3.01 trillion. The bank's net profit for the whole year was RMB 39.776 billion. On 10 January 2017, Postal Savings Bank of China held a press conference in Beijing to announce the launch of a blockchain-based asset custody system. This system, implemented with Hyperledger Fabric software developed by IBM, is used in the bank's core business system and marks the first successful case of a Chinese bank applying blockchain technology to its core business system.

== Leadership ==
=== List of governors ===
Name (English)	Name (Chinese)	Tenure begins	Tenure ends	Note
Tao Liming	陶礼明	March 2007	2012	
Lü Jiajin	吕家进	January 2013	January 2019	
Guo Xinshuang	郭新双	January 2020	January 2021	
Liu Jianjun	刘建军	June 2021		

=== List of chairmen of the board ===
Name (English)	Name (Chinese)	Tenure begins	Tenure ends	Note
Liu Andong	刘安东	March 2007	September 2011	
Li Guohua	李国华	January 2012	July 2018	
Zhang Jinliang	张金良	May 2019	April 2022	
Liu Jianjun	刘建军	April 2022		

== See also ==
- Postal savings system
