= Surface Air Lifted =

International postal service

Surface Air Lifted (SAL) is a postal service used to send international mail items. Thirty-nine postal authorities provide this service. It is a cost-effective international mail. At first SAL mail is processed and transported by surface in the origin country. Then it is transported by air to the destination country and finally processed and delivered as standard-type mail by the destination postal administration. The service is faster than surface mail while the cost is lower than air mail. SAL is more economical for sending heavy items; with light items, it sometimes costs more than air mail.

== History ==
Prior to World War II a number of European countries adopted the practice of forwarding letters to distant destinations at no extra cost to the sender (such as British mail sent to most parts of the British Empire). The consistently high costs of air mail curtailed this trend after the war. During the mid-1960s in response to the continuing increase of aircraft capacity, the UPU adopted the policy of maximizing air conveyance of mail and in the mid-1970s the concept of “surface air lifted” mail was developed in conjunction with the International Air Transport Association (IATA).

This arrangement allows some mail to receive, for little or no surcharge, speedier transmission than by surface but without the priority of fully surcharged mail.

== See also ==
- Express Mail Service (EMS)
