= Post Mart =

Joint venture

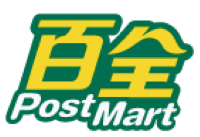
Company logo

Post Mart is a joint-venture between China Post Group and U.S.-owned China Horizon Investments Group. Post Mart provides consumer goods to people in rural China using the existing China Post network of hundreds of thousands of village postal stations as well as a network of distribution centers.

In January 2016, China Horizon Investments sued China Post for fraud and breach of contract in relation to this venture.

== Background ==
China Horizon Investments Group was founded in January 2007 by Alan Clingman for the purpose of investing in the growth of Chinese domestic consumption projects alongside major Chinese entities, especially state-owned entities.

China Post is the official postal service of China. The State Post Bureau, the owner of China Post, is both a regulatory authority and government-owned enterprise. Thus, it is responsible for the regulation of the national postal industry and the management of national postal enterprises. China Post also owns one of China's largest banks, the EMS courier service, an insurance company and a large-scale distribution business.

Following a multi-year pilot program, regulatory approvals for the China Horizon and China Post Joint Venture were granted in September 2015.

The joint venture has a registered capital of RMB 1 billion and has a license to use the China Post brand.

== Operations ==
Post Mart established a route to market sales and delivery system in Henan. It planned to roll this out nationally, reaching 10 provinces within five years. There are currently more than 50,000 village postal stations in Henan.

Post Mart operates a loyalty program called the Post Mart Emerald Club.

== Products ==
Post Mart provides a range of daily supply products such as cooking oil, rice, household goods, personal items and beverages such as Coca-Cola. Their brands include Chinese brands, international brands and its own brand.
