= Express mail =

Accelerated mail delivery service

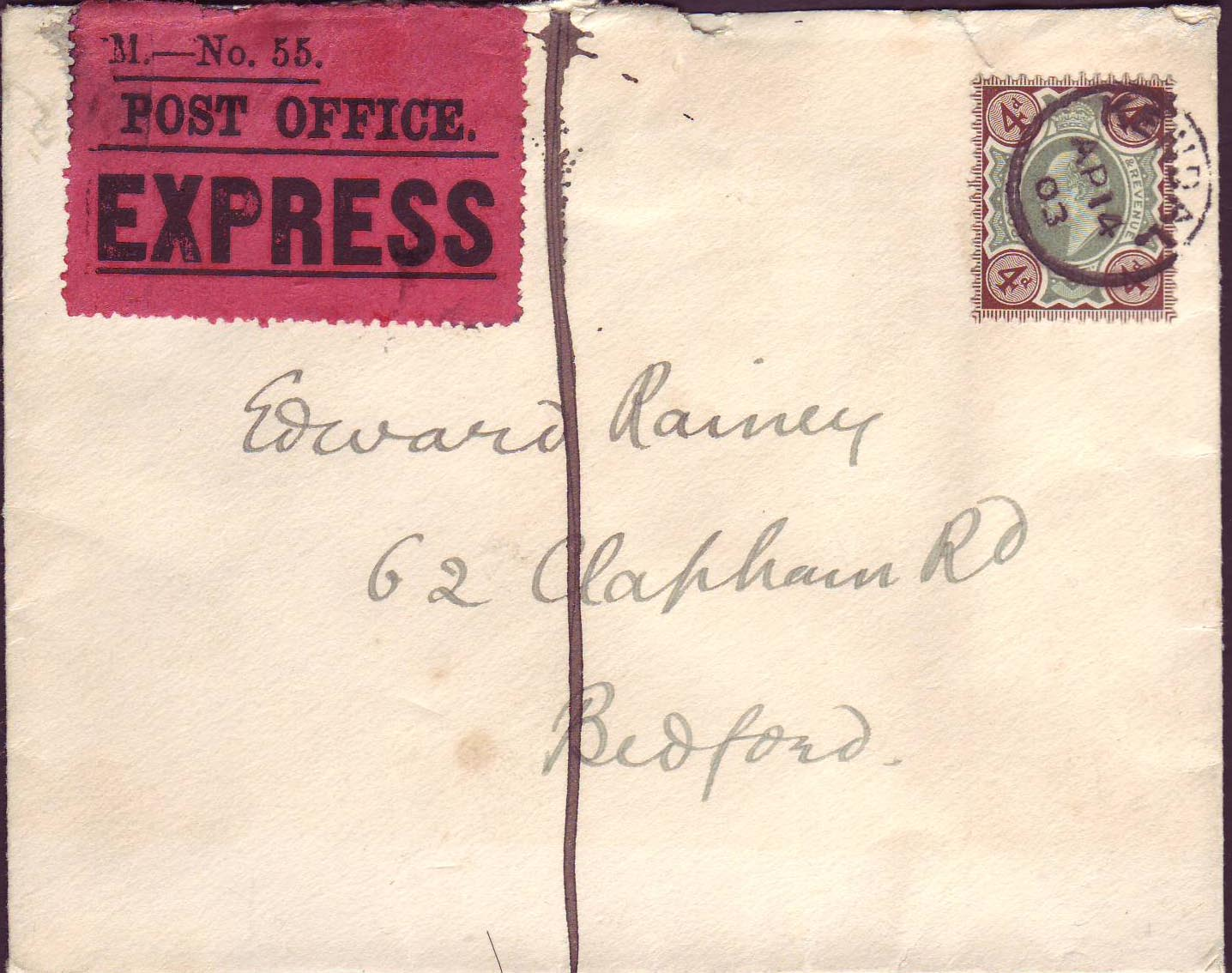
1903 4d Express mail cover from Kendall-Bedford with red official Royal Mail express label affixed. The vertical line also indicates that express service is required.

Express mail is an expedited mail delivery service for which the customer pays a premium for faster delivery. Express mail is a service for domestic and international mail, and is in most nations governed by the country's own postal administration. Since 1999, the international express delivery services have been governed by the EMS Cooperative.

There are five different types of Express Mail service, including same day airport service, custom designed service, next day service, second day service, and military service. Express Mail International service is available between the United States and most foreign countries. Express Mail is a USPS trademark. The cost of Express Mail is competitive with other overnight mail delivery services, such as Federal Express, but is not available to all U.S. addresses. The fee varies by service type and piece weight. Size and weight limits apply.

== History ==
The very first traces of mail can be found in Ancient Egypt around 2000 B.C. The postal service was exclusive to the pharaohs who used couriers to send out directives throughout the state's territory. Around 550-330 BCE, the Achaemenid Persians would deliver through a system of couriers on horseback. Travelling through the Royal Road, a message could be sent from Susa to Sardis between seven and nine days. Like Ancient Egypt, mail in the Persian Empire was not just for anyone: only the king and influential leaders could use the postal system. The Greek historian Herodotus once wrote in 500 BC: "Neither snow nor rain nor heat nor gloom of night stays these couriers from the swift completion of their appointed rounds." He was describing the Persian postal service, which he deeply admired. This is also USPS's unofficial motto and slogan. Much later, about 20 BCE, the emperor Augustus created Cursus Publicus, the courier and transportation service of the Roman Empire. Scholars have estimated that the average speed of a messenger over the Roman road system was about 50 miles per day.

== Express Mail Service and the EMS Cooperative ==
Express Mail Service (EMS) service logo

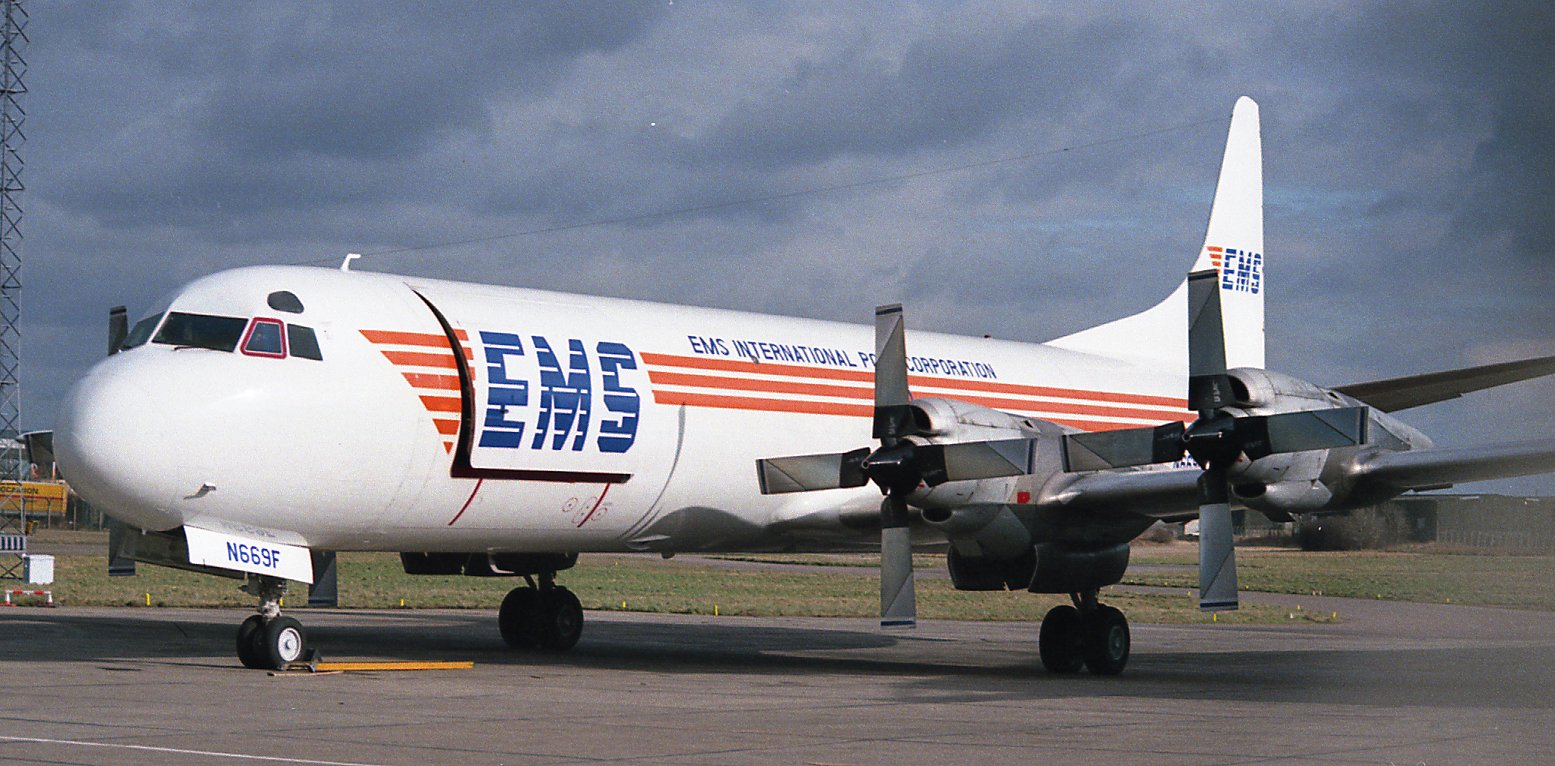
Express Mail Service liveried aircraft at London Stansted Airport in 1993

Express Mail Service (EMS) is an express mail service for documents and merchandise launched on July 15, 1980. It is an international express postal service offered by postal administration members of the Universal Postal Union (UPU), and within China it is a courier service provided by China Post. These administrators created the EMS Cooperative in 1998, within the framework of the UPU, to promote the harmonization and development of postal services worldwide. As of January 2015, EMS was offered by more than 190 countries and territories worldwide.

Main business: EMS Express Mail Service mainly provides high-end services such as domestic and international express mail, intra-provincial Next Morning Delivery and Next Day Delivery, International Guaranteed Service, and Time-Definite Delivery. This business enjoys priority handling rights in Customs, Aviation and other departments.

An independent auditor measures the express delivery performance of all international EMS operators, and EMS Performance Awards are based on postal operators' performance, including service performance and tracking: gold, silver, or bronze certificates are awarded to EMS Cooperative members depending on their yearly performance. These EMS award winners are recorded in the EMS Cooperative's Hall of Fame.

== EMS Cooperative members ==
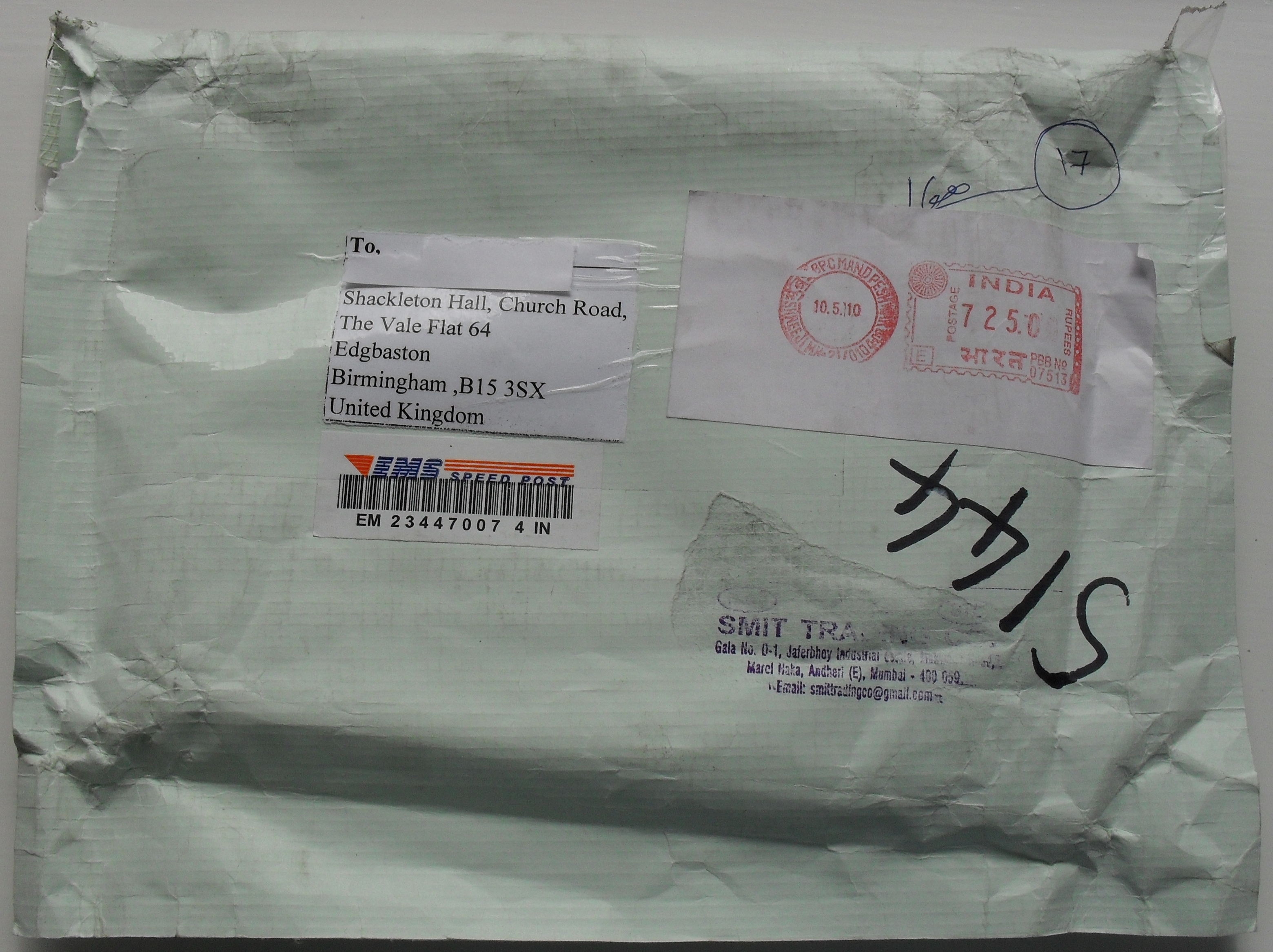
EMS SpeedPost from India

Since its creation, 182 postal administrations have joined the EMS Cooperative, representing over 85% of EMS operators worldwide.

== Other providers ==
The express mail industry has grown significantly in recent decades due to the ability to provide overnight package delivery services. Many transportation logistics firms offer similar accelerated services. DHL Express (DHL), Federal Express (FedEx), and United Parcel Service (UPS) are the most popular alternatives. The three competitors held 85% of the market share in the past. By 1996, the express mail industry in the US alone was worth $16-17 billion. However, in many countries such alternative carriers' shipments have a different status for several legal purposes. For example, in Russia, shipments from abroad to individuals for private needs are exempt from customs duties if valued less than €1000 and sent via post or EMS, while when sent by other means the exemption applies to values below €250 only. In some countries legal notification sent by post and EMS are deemed made on the date of dispatch, while for other couriers on the date of delivery only. Another example is Cainiao Network, the logistics arm of Alibaba Group, which consolidates parcels ordered by the same consumer from multiple merchants during the fulfillment process to increase delivery speed without additional costs. Since 2020, Cainiao’s system has consolidated millions of parcels shipped from China to over 50 countries, achieving at least a 50% reduction in delivery time and saving tens of millions of dollars annually, benefiting Cainiao, merchants, e-commerce platforms, and consumers.

== See also ==
- Express mail in the United States
- Gallows letter
- Mail
- Pony Express
- Postal administration
- S10 (UPU standard)
- Surface Air Lifted (SAL)
