= China Post =

State-owned postal service of China

China Post Group Corporation

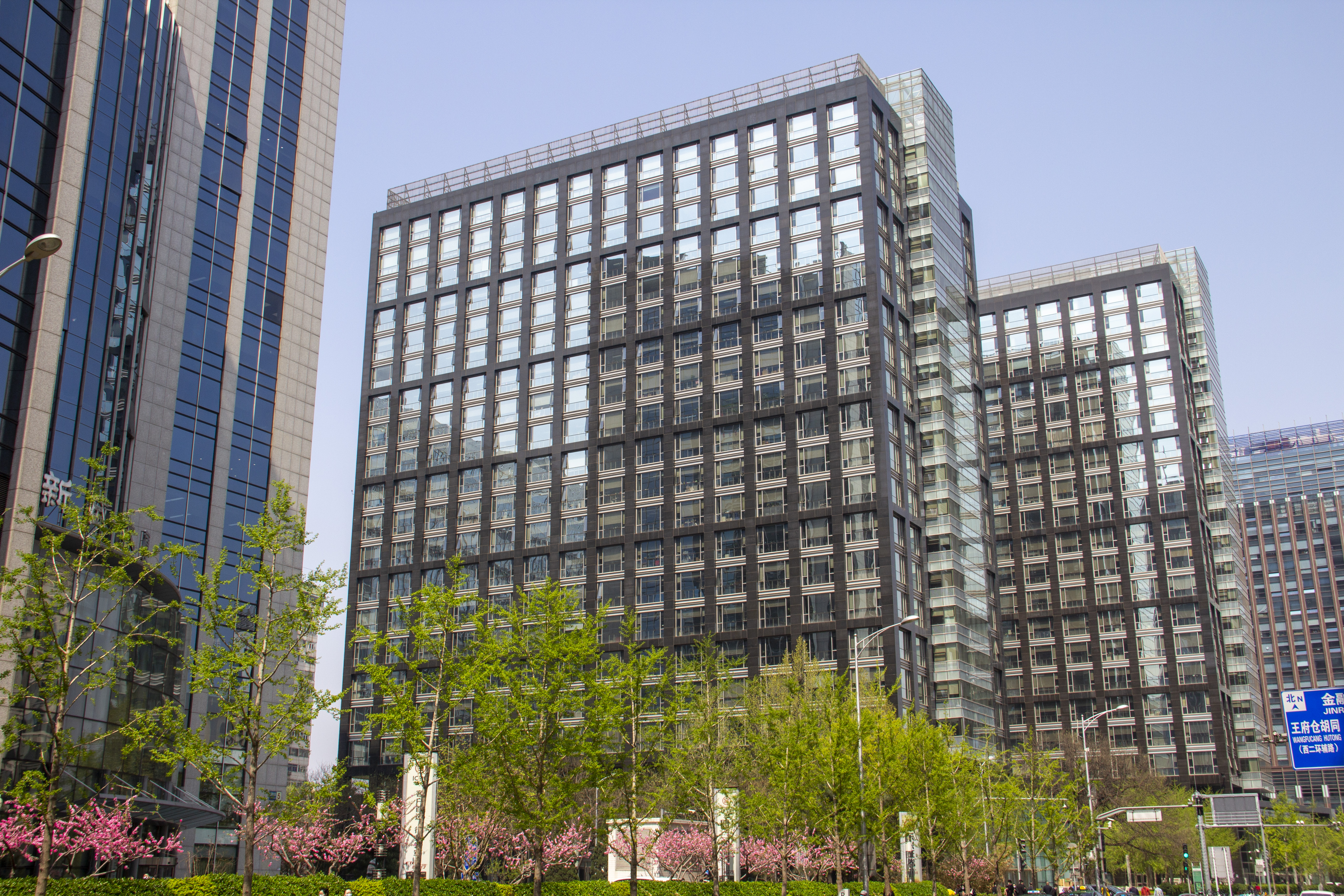
- Headquarters in Beijing, China
- Native name: 中国邮政集团有限公司
- Type: State-owned enterprise
- Industry: Courier
- Founded: 1949
- Founder: Government of China
- Headquarters: No. A3 Jinrong Street, Xicheng District, Beijing, China
- Area served: Mainland China
- Key people: Ma Junsheng, Director-General As of 31 October 2008
- Services: Letter post, parcel service, EMS, delivery, freight forwarding, third-party logistics, deposit account
- Revenue: US$ 112.8 billion (2023)
- Net income: US$ 5.9 billion (2023)
- Total assets: US$ 2,310.6 billion (2023)
- Owner: People's Republic of China
- Number of employees: 728,776 (2023)
- Parent: State Council via the Ministry of Finance
- Subsidiaries: China Postal Airlines; Postal Savings Bank of China; China National Philatelic Corporation; Post Mart
- Website: english.chinapost.com.cn

China Post Group Company
- Simplified Chinese: 中国邮政集团有限公司
- Traditional Chinese: 中國郵政集團有限公司
- Literal meaning: China Postal Services Group Limited Corporation
Transcriptions
Standard Mandarin
- Hanyu Pinyin: Zhōngguó Yóuzhèng Jítuán Yoǔxiàn Gōngsī

Alternative Chinese name
- Simplified Chinese: 中国邮政
- Traditional Chinese: 中國郵政
- Literal meaning: China Post
Transcriptions
Standard Mandarin
- Hanyu Pinyin: Zhōngguó Yóuzhèng
- IPA: [ʈʂʊ́ŋkwǒ jǒʊʈʂə̂ŋ]

China Post, officially the China Post Group Corporation, is the national postal service corporation of the People's Republic of China. It is incorporated as a state-owned enterprise.

China Post shares its office with the sub-ministry-level government agency State Post Bureau, which regulates the national postal industry.

== History ==
The current postal service of People's Republic of China was established in 1949. It replaced the Chunghwa Post in mainland China in 1949, as well as in the Universal Postal Union in 1972. It was formerly administered by the Ministry of Posts and Telecommunications.

China Post is directly supervised by the State Post Bureau which has overall responsibility for regulating postal service in China. The State Post Bureau operates under the State Council of China.

== Organizational structure ==
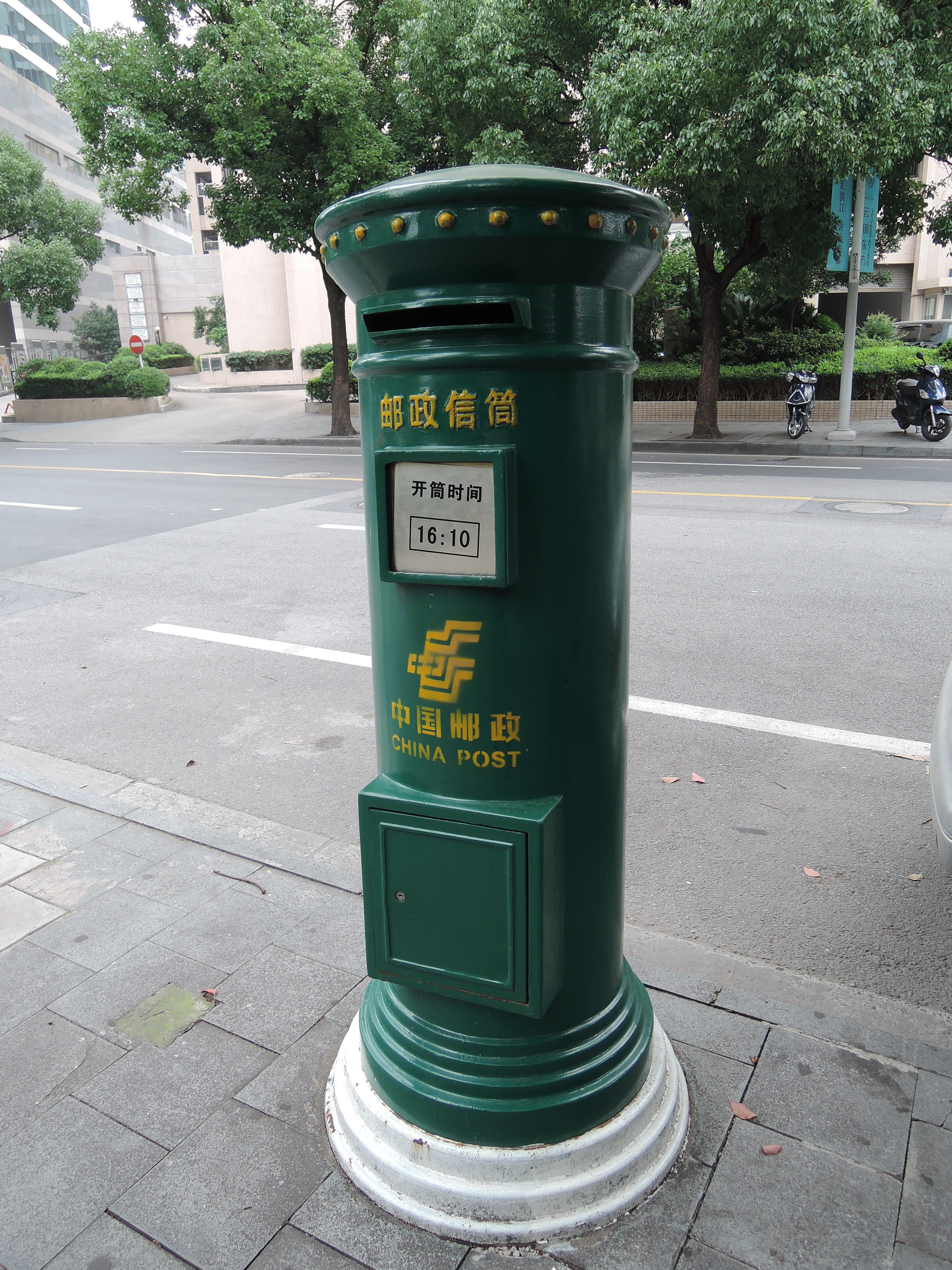
A China Post postbox in Shanghai

After the separation from the State Post Bureau and several re-organization, China Post is currently organized along the following structure.

- General Office
- Department of Strategic Planning (Legal Affairs)
- Department of Market
- Department of Financial Service
  - Postal Savings Bank of China
  - China Post Life Insurance
  - China Post Securities
  - China Post Capital Management
- Department of Finance
- Department of Human Resources
- Department of Planning and Construction
- Department of Procurement Management
- Department of Audit
- Department of Party Building Work
- Office of Inspection
- China Post Trade Union
- Unit of Parcel, Express and Logistics Business (China Postal Express and Logistice Co., Ltd.)
- China National Philatelic Corporation
- China Post Culture and History Center (China National Post and Postage Stamp Museum)
- China Post News Press
- Postage Stamp Printing Bureau (Beijing Stamp Factory)
- Shijiazhuang Posts and Telecommunications Technical College (China Post Training Center & Party School)
- China Post Group IT (Beijing) Co., Ltd.
- China Post E-commerce Co.
- China Post Advertising Co., Ltd.
- Other province-level, prefecture-level and county-level branches

== China Post Service ==
International services for China Post include Small Parcel, Large Package and EMS. The Small parcel and large package of China Post can be tracked if registered. According to transportation methods, it can be divided into three categories: Air Parcel, Surface Air Lift (SAL) Parcel, and Surface Parcel. China Post air mail/parcel is the most popular because it is cheap and convenient. EMS is faster than China Post Mail but more expensive.

The average delivery speed depends on the type of service and the trade and communication links with the destination country of the cargo or parcel. For instance, the delivery time for cargo from China to the USA, regardless of the service type, is approximately 19 days.

China Post does currently not offer shipping by boat to the United States from Mainland China. This policy went into effect November 2021.

== Operations ==
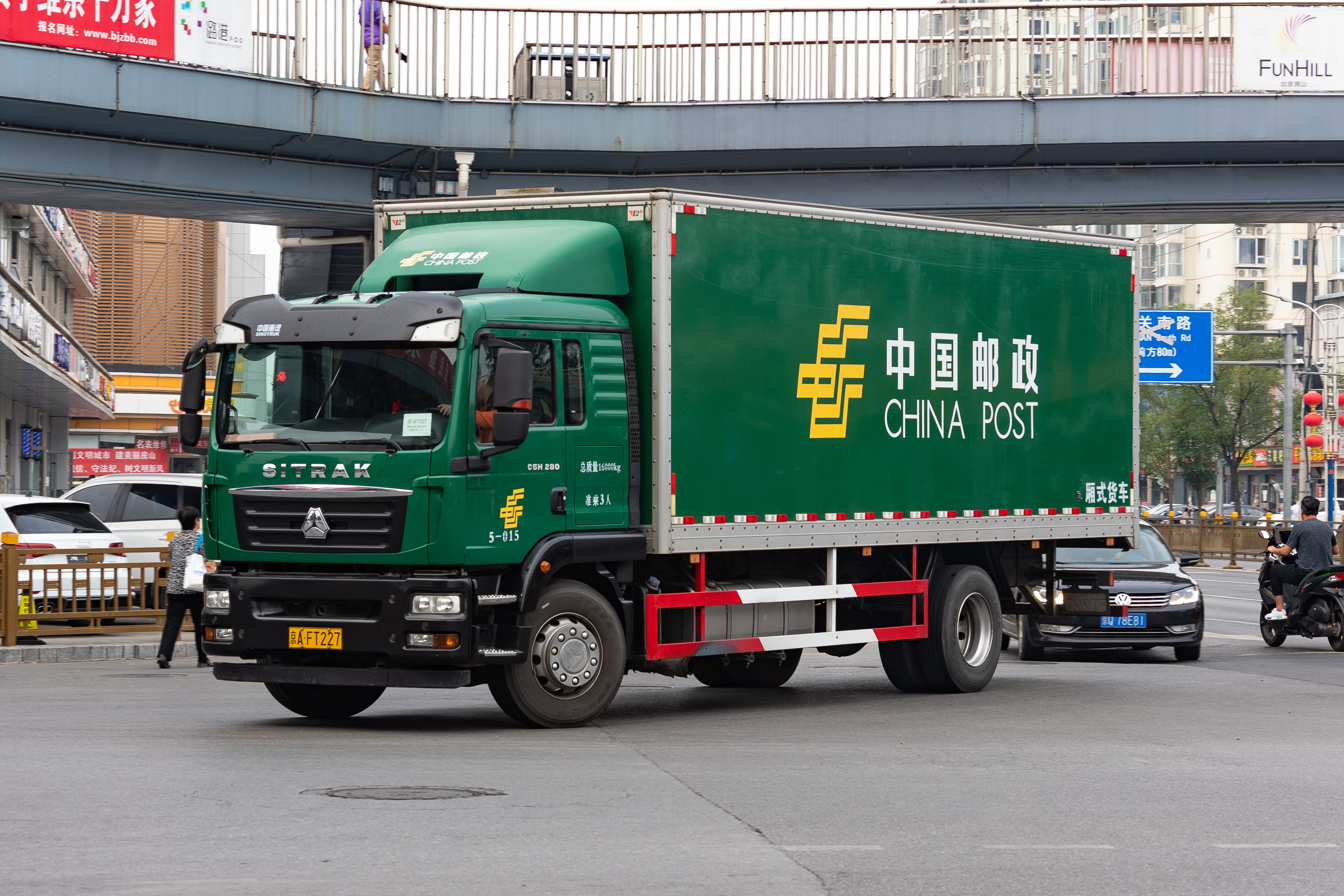
A mail truck in Beijing

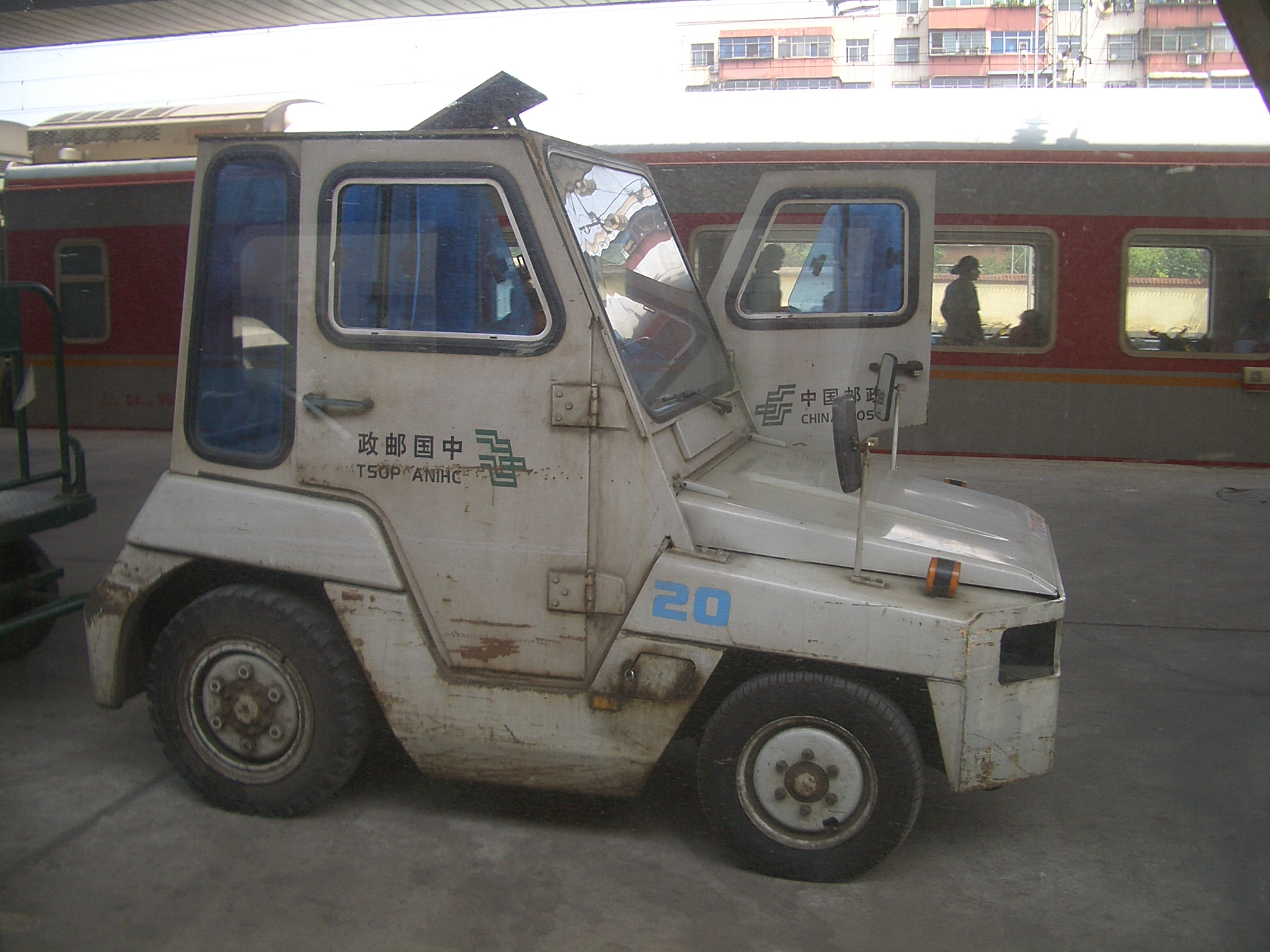
A postal car towing trailers with mail, at a train station, notice that the right side door signage is transposed: CHINA POST TSOP ANIHC

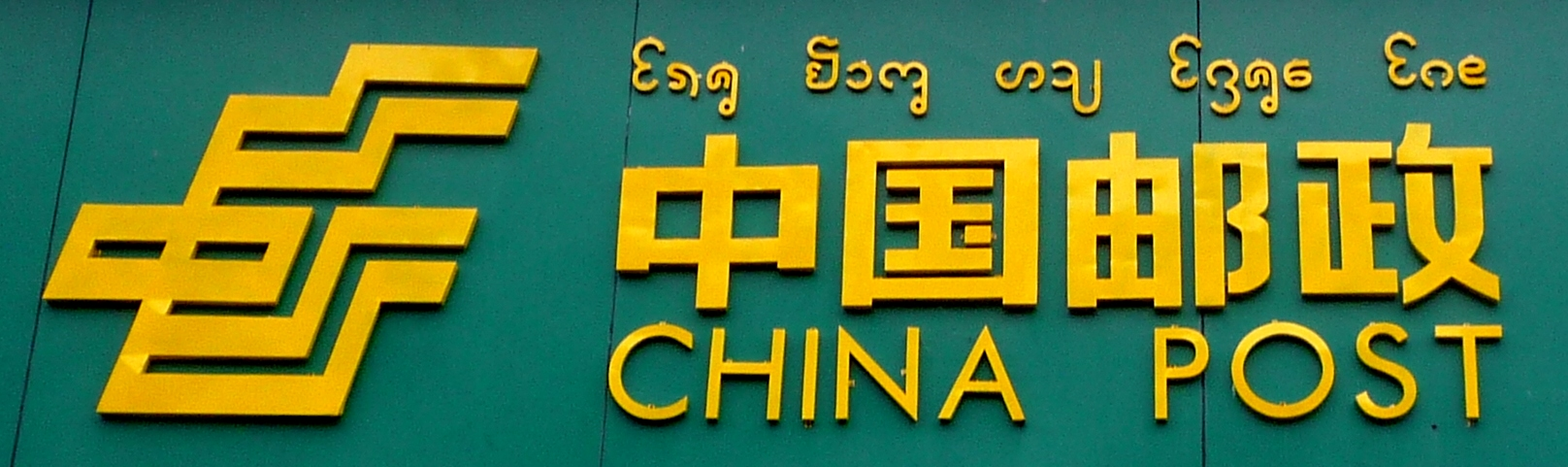
China Post logo with (New) Tai Lü script in Mohan, Yunnan

- Postal offices and branches: 373,600 (2019)
- Mail processing centers: 236
- First and second class truck route: 6.3 million kilometers (2014)
- Transportation vehicles: 86,000 (2014)
- Aircraft: 33 (2020)
- Railway carriages: 174 (2014)
- Letter sorting machines: 155
- Automatic parcel sorting machines: 209
- Computerized postal offices: 20,000

== See also ==
- State Post Bureau
- Hongkong Post
- CTT (Macau)
- Chunghwa Post
- Chinese postal romanization
- China Postal Savings Bank
- China Postal Airlines
- List of postal entities
- List of national postal services
- Universal Postal Union
