= Wireline =

Wireline may refer to:

- Slickline, a cabling technology used for oil-well completions and maintenance
- Wireline (cabling), a cabling technology involving sending a current to downhole logging tools in oil-well exploration and completions
- Wired communication, an electric networking technology
- Wireline (recording studio), a hybrid analog/digital recording facility in Midland, Texas
- Plain Old Telephone Service, a traditional land-line telephone system
