= Surface mail =

Mail transported by land and sea

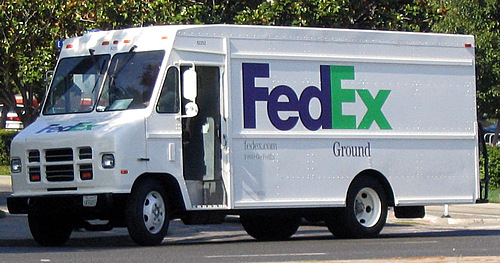
Surface mail is transported via truck, rail, and ship, rather than by plane, as in this FedEx Ground truck.

Surface mail, also known as sea mail, is mail that is transported by land and sea (along the surface of the Earth), rather than by air, as in airmail. Surface mail is significantly less expensive but slower than airmail, and thus is preferred for large or heavy, non-urgent items and is primarily used for sending packages, not letters.

== History ==
The term "surface mail" arose as a retronym (retrospective term), following the development of airmail – a term was needed to describe traditional mail, for which purpose "surface mail" was coined. A more recent example of the same process is the term snail mail (to refer to physical mail, be it transported by surface or air), following the development of email.

== By country ==
=== Australia ===
Australia Post offers international surface mail (known as seamail) for parcels 2kg and over.

=== Canada ===
In September 2025, the Government of Canada adjusted the delivery standards for Canada Post to allow surface transport for non-urgent lettermail, in response to lower mail volumes. This change effectively reintroduced long distance surface mail in Canada.

=== Israel ===
The Israel Postal Company (Hebrew: דואר ישראל, romanized: Do'ar Yisra'el) offers international surface mail (known as "sea and land mail", (Hebrew: דואר ים ויבשה, romanized: Do'ar Yam v'Yabasha).

=== United States ===
In 2007, the US Postal Service discontinued its outbound international surface mail ("sea mail") service, mainly because of increased costs. Returned undeliverable surface parcels had become an expensive problem for the USPS, since it was often required to take such parcels back.

Domestic surface mail (now "USPS Ground Advantage") remains available. Surface mail transportation also remains available to certain overseas military and diplomatic posts.

Alternatives to international surface mail include:

- International Surface Air Lift (ISAL). The service includes neither tracking nor insurance; but it may be possible to purchase shipping insurance from a third-party company. This service uses air transportation to leave the US but is then entered into the destination country's surface mail network.
- USPS Commercial ePacket. The service is trackable.
- Ordinary first-class international airmail.

Senders can access the International Surface Air Lift and ePacket services through postal wholesalers. Some examples of such wholesalers include:

- Asendia USA (accessible through the Shippo website to users who have an Asendia account),
- Globegistics (now owned by Asendia), and
- APC Postal Logistics.

If a sender sends an ISAL mailing directly through the USPS (without a wholesaler as an intermediary), the minimum weight is 50 pounds per mailing. ePacket mailings can never be sent directly through the USPS; senders must always use a wholesaler.

== See also ==
- Parcel post
- Surface transport
