= Natural rope =

Rope made from natural fibers

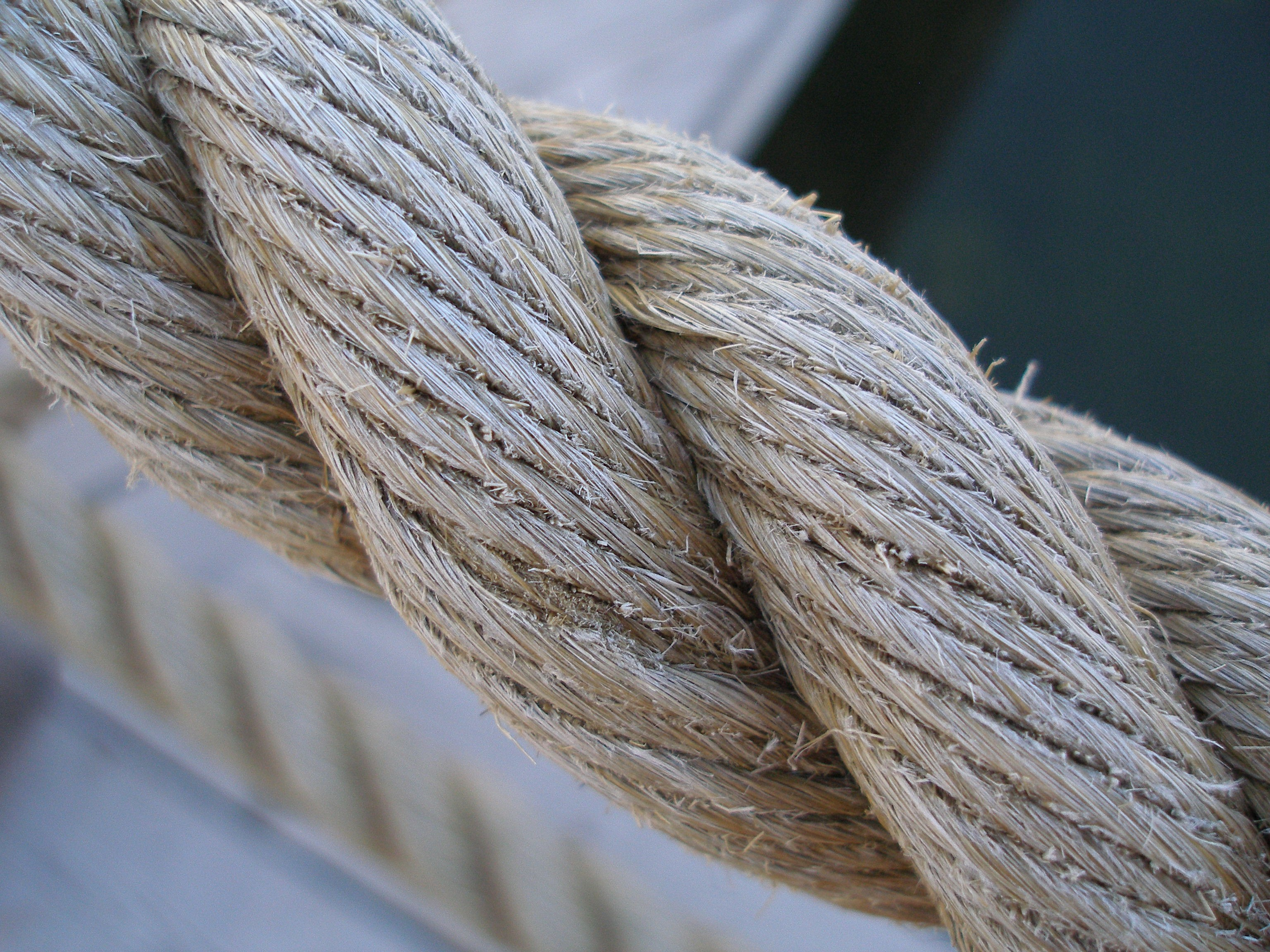
Three strand natural fiber rope

A natural rope is a rope that is made from natural fibers. These fibers are obtained from organic material (such as materials produced by plants). Natural ropes suffer from many problems, including susceptibility to rotting, degradation, mildew and wear out very quickly.

== Materials ==
Cotton, sisal, manila, coir, and papyrus can be used to create a natural rope.

== Disadvantages compared to synthetic ropes ==
Natural ropes suffer from many problems when compared to synthetic ropes. Natural ropes are susceptible to rot, degradation, and mildew. Natural ropes also wear out quickly and lose their strength when placed in water.

== See also ==
- Synthetic rope
- Fiber rope
- Wire rope
