= Natural sponge =

Natural sponge may refer to:

- Luffa aegyptiaca, plant fibre sponge
- Sea sponge, animal fibre sponge
