= Gallows letter =

Letter to be delivered quickly in postal history

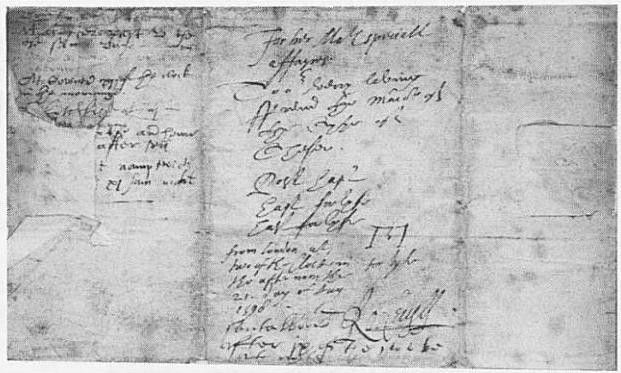
Gallows letter, England, 21 August 1598

In postal history, a gallows letter was a letter with a "gallows" mark meaning "very quickly".

Gallows letters were official letters or dispatches used by the Privy Council of Elizabeth I of England. To express an extreme degree of urgency of delivery, the letter had on the address panel a rough drawing of a gallows. Sometimes the picture included a hanging body. These drawings could also have repeated written directions as "haste haste", "post haste", "haste for life", "for life haste", etc.

There are also modern forgeries of such letters. This is when counterfeit gallows marks have been applied onto original letters.

== See also ==
- Envelope
- Letter (message)
