= Lists of English words =

English words sharing common features

The following articles list English words that share certain features in common.

== Lists of words ==
- List of animal names
- List of buzzwords
- List of English homographs
- List of English words with disputed usage
- List of English–Spanish interlingual homographs
- List of ethnic slurs
- List of generic and genericized trademarks
- List of Germanic and Latinate equivalents in English
- List of self-contradicting words in English
- Lists of Merriam-Webster's Words of the Year
- Most common words in English

=== With unusual spelling ===
- English words without vowels
- List of English words containing Q not followed by U
- List of English words that may be spelled with a ligature

=== By formation ===
- List of English apocopations
- List of English back-formations
- List of portmanteaus
- List of retronyms
- List of words ending in ology
- -graphy
- -ism

=== By pronunciation ===
- List of English words without rhymes
- List of the longest English words with one syllable
- List of onomatopoeias

=== By provenance ===
- List of calques
- Lists of English words by country or language of origin

=== By part of speech ===
- List of collective nouns
- List of English auxiliary verbs
- List of English copulae
- List of English determiners
- List of English irregular verbs
- List of English prepositions
- List of eponymous adjectives in English
- Post-positive adjective

=== Regionalisms ===
- List of American words not widely used in the United Kingdom
- List of British words not widely used in the United States
- List of South African English regionalisms
- List of words having different meanings in American and British English (A–L)
- List of words having different meanings in American and British English (M–Z)

== See also ==
- List of English-language idioms
  - List of 19th-century English language idioms
- List of kennings
- List of Latin and Greek words commonly used in systematic names
- List of Newspeak words
- List of works with different titles in the United Kingdom and United States
- Longest word in English
- Glossary of American terms not widely used in the United Kingdom
- Glossary of British terms not widely used in the United States

=== Articles about English word lists ===
- Academic Word List
- Collins Scrabble Words
- Dolch word list
- General Service List
- NASPA Word List (formerly Official Tournament and Club Word List)
- New General Service List
