= List of English abbreviations made by shortening words =

This is a list of common abbreviations in the English language.

== A ==
ab
abdominal muscle (slang)
abalone
abscess (slang)
ad
advantage (tennis)
advertisement
advert
advertisement
addy
[email] address
admin
administrator
administration
afish
aficionado
ag
agriculture (informal)
aggro
aggravation or aggression
agit-prop
agitational propaganda
alky
an alcoholic
amp
ampere
amphetamine (as in "amped up")
amplifier
amputation or amputee
ampoule
amplify
app
application
arco
arcology
Argie
Argentine, Argentinian
Aspie
Someone with Asperger syndrome
auto
automobile
automatic
av or avvie (also avvy)
avatar

== B ==
bennies
benzedrine (slang)
benefits
bevvy
beverage (usu. alcoholic)
bi
bisexual (slang)
bike
bicycle
bio
biology
biography (informal)
Birks
Birkenstocks
biz
business (informal)
black ops
black operations
bod
body (slang/informal)
bookie
bookmaker
bra
brassiere
bread
bread and honey (money)
bro
brother (slang)
bronc
bronco
bronto
Brontosaurus
bud
buddy (informal)
budgie
budgerigar
bunk
bunkum

== C ==
cab
Cabernet Sauvignon
cabriolet
caff (UK slang)
café
cal
calorie (in combination, especially "lo-cal")
Cal or Cali
California
Calcutta
cam
camera
camouflage
camo
camouflage
Can
Canada or Canadian (in combination)
cap
captain
lie (informal)
caps
capitals
carbs
carbohydrates
cardio
cardiovascular training (aerobic exercise)
cat
catalytic converter
catamaran
chem
chemistry
chemo
chemotherapy
Chevy
Chevrolet
chimp
chimpanzee
cig
cigarette
cishet or cis-het
cisgender-heterosexual
civ
civilization
civvy or civvie
civilian
civvies
civilian clothes (military slang)
clit
clitoris
coed
coeducational
coke
cocaine
Coke
Coca-Cola
com
command
communication (especially in combinations)
combi or combo
combination
Commie
Communist
con
confidence trick
convention
convict
condo
condominium
congrats
congratulations
contacts
contact lenses
co-op
cooperative
corp
corporation
cred
credibility
crip
cripple
croc
crocodile
curio
curiosity
cuz
cousin
cyber
cybernetic (especially in combination)

== D ==
decaf
decaffeinated
decal
decalcomania
decij
decision
deco
decoration
deets
details
defrag
defragment
deli
delicatessen
delish
delicious
Dem
Democrat
demo
demonstration
demolition
derm
dermatologist
dermatological
depict
depicture
detox
detoxification
dicot
dicotyledon
dif (or diff)
difference
digi
digital
digi cabes
digital cable
dino
dinosaur
dis (or diss)
disrespect
disco
discotheque
doc
doctor
document
dorm
dormitory
Dub
Dubliner

== E ==
e-
electronic (e.g. email, efit, emeter)
ed
education
emo
emotional
ep
episode
eppie, eppy
epileptic seizure
ex
ex-(boyfriend, wife, etc.)
exhibition
war exercise
exam
examination
exec
executive
expo
exposition

== F ==
fab
fabrication
fabulous
fan
fanatic
fav
favorite
fed
federal
frack
fracture
frag
fragmentation grenade, also verb: to kill with such a grenade.
frank
frankfurter
fridge
refrigerator

== G ==
ganj
ganja
gas
gasoline
gat
Gatling gun
gig
gigabyte
gin
Geneva
glutes
gluteus maximus
go fig
go figure
gov, guv
governor
government
grad
graduate (or graduation, as in "grad night")
gran, granny
grandmother
guac
guacamole
gym
gymnasium

== H ==
ham, hammy
hamster
hash
hashish
hep
hepatitis
hetero or het
heterosexual
hifi
high fidelity system
hi(gh) res
high resolution
hippo
hippopotamus
homo
homosexual
homogenized (milk)
hydro
hydroelectricity
hydrotherapy
hydrothermal
hydroponic
hype
hyperbole
hypo
hypodermic
hyper
hyperactive

== I ==
Inc
Incorporated
indie, indy
independence, independent
independent music
independent film
Indy 500
Indianapolis 500
inf
infinitely
info
information
infra dig
infra dignitatem (beneath one's dignity) (borrowed from Latin)
inti
intifada
intro
introduction
ipecac
ipecacuanha
Itey
Italian (offensive)

== J ==
Jap
Japanese (offensive)
Jerry
German (offensive, historical)

== K ==
kilo
kilogram
klepto
kleptomaniac

== L ==
lab
laboratory
(cap.) Labrador Retriever
lav, lavvy
lavatory
legit
legitimate
les, lez, or lesbo
lesbian
lib
liberal
liberation
library (computer science)
(cap.) Libertarian
Lib-Lab
Liberal-Labour (UK)
limo
limousine
lino
linoleum
Linotype machine
lit
literature
lit crit
literary criticism
lo-cal
low-calorie
log
logarithm

== M ==
mac
macadam
macaroni
(with initial capital) Apple Macintosh
McIntosh apple
(or mack) Mackintosh raincoat
macro
macroinstruction
mag
magazine
magnet
magnification
magnesium alloy wheels
magnum
Man United
Manchester United F.C.
Mass
Massachusetts
maths (UK) or math (U.S.)
mathematics
matric
matriculation
max
maximum
mayo
mayonnaise
med, meds
medication
medic
(with initial capital) Mediterranean (the sea or the surrounding area)
meg
megabyte
memo
memorandum
meth
methamphetamine
meths
methylated spirits
Mex or Mexi
Mexican
mezc
mescaline
mike or mic
microphone
mig
milligram mg
mil
military
millilitre
Minn
Minnesota
Miss
Mississippi
mod
moderator
modern
modification
modular
modulo
mono
monaural
monochrome
mononucleosis
monocot
monocotyledon
movie
feature film (i.e. moving picture)

== N ==
natch
naturally
neg
negative
negs
(photographic) negatives
negative hits
net
Internet
neocon
neoconservative
neolib
neoliberal
Newfy (derogatory)
Newfoundlander
Nip
A Japanese (derogatory, Nipponese)
nympho
nymphomaniac

== O ==
op
optical art
optical
operation
operator
opportunity
op-ed
"opposite the editorial (page)", possibly "Opinion-Editorial" page
orang
orangutan

== P ==
Paki
Pakistani (pejorative)
Paleo diet
Paleolithic diet
pants
pantaloons
pap, paps
paparazzi
pec
pectoral muscle
peeps
people (slang)
Peke
Pekingese
Penn
Pennsylvania
perk
perquisite
perp
perpetrator (slang)
perv
pervert
photo
photograph (informal)
photo op
photo(graphic) opportunity
phys ed
physical education (informal)
piano
pianoforte
pic (plural pics or pix)
(motion) picture (slang)
(photographic) picture (slang)
pol
politician (informal)
polio
poliomyelitis
poly
polyamorous
polyester
polyethylene
polygraph (U.S. government, as in "full scope poly")
polymer
Polynesian
polytechnic
po-mo
post-modern
pop
popular (informal)
popular music
porn or porno
pornography (slang)
postgrad
postgraduate
pram
perambulator, a baby carriage
prefs
preferences
preg
pregnant
prelim
preliminary (examination)
prep
preparatory
pres or prez
president
pro
professional
prof
professor
prom
promenade
promo
promotion
prop
propaganda
propeller
proposition
property (especially in theater sense)
psych
psychology
psycho
psychopath
pub
publication
public house
pullie
pullover
pulsar
pulsating
star
pyro
pyromaniac
pyrotechnic

== Q ==
quad
quadrangle (courtyard)
quadruplet
quadriceps muscles
quadcopter (quad-engine helicopter)
quadbike (New Zealand)
quin, quint (U.S. and Canada)
quintuplet

== R ==
rad
radian
radiator
radical
(military) radio
radfem
radical feminist
radio
radiotelegraphy
raspberry, razzy
raspberry tart (fart; more commonly, the derisive sound made with the tongue and lips; a Bronx cheer)
rasp
raspberry
Rasta
Rastafarian
Reb
Rebel (i.e., Confederate)
rec
recreation
(all capital) record
recon, reccy
reconnaissance
ref
referee
reference
reg
registration (UK: /ˈrɛdʒ/, of a motor vehicle)
regulation /ˈrɛɡ/
rehab
rehabilitation
rep
repetition
representative
(with initial capital) Republican
reputation
repo
repossession
repo man – repossession person
res
reserve (Indian or military)
residence
resolution
resp
respiratory
retro
retro-rocket
retrospective
rev
revolution (of a record, engine, etc.)
reverend
rhino
rhinoceros
ril
really
Rhodie
Rhodesian Ridgeback
Rhodesian
Rhode Island red
Rolls
a Rolls-Royce
ruck
rucksack
rum
rumbullion (obsolete)

== S ==
sales rep
sales representative
San Fran
San Francisco
sarge
sergeant
sarky (UK)
sarcastic
Satch
Joe Satriani
sax
saxophone
schizo
schizophrenic
Scottie
Scottish Terrier
scrum
scrummage (now mostly used in rugby football)
Sea-Tac
Seattle-Tacoma
sec
second
secant
Semper Fi!
Semper Fidelis
sig
significant (figures)
signal
(Internet) signature
sim
simulation
sis
sister
soph
sophomore
sosh
social (in the context of social security number)
spats
spatterdashes
spec
specialist
specification
speculation
specs
specifications
spectacles
sperm
spermaceti
spermatozoön
staph
staphylococcus
stat
statim (borrowed from Latin)
stats
statistics
steno
stenographer
stereo
stereophony
strep
streptococcus
stude
student
sub
subaltern
subeditor
subsidiary
sublieutenant
submarine
subordinate
subscriber
(especially as subs) subscription
subsistence money (an advance payment)
substitute
subway
sum
summarize
sus (or suss)
suspect
sush
sushi
sync or synch
synchronization
syncopation
synth
synthesizer
syph
syphilis

== T ==
tab
tabulation
tan
tangent
tarp
tarpaulin
taxi or taxicab
taximeter cabriolet
tech
technician
technology
techno
technology
teddy
teddy bear
teen
teenager, teenage
tele or telly
television
terb
terrible
titfer
tit for tat (hat)
tog
obsolete togeman, from obsolete French togue, cloak, from Latin toga, garment
trad
tradition(al)
tranny
transmission
transsexual or transgender (slur/offensive)
transistor radio (obsolete)
tranq
tranquilizer
trans
transgender
trig
trigonometry
Trot
Trotskyite
turp, turps
turpentine
tux
tuxedo
twofer
two for one, two for the price of one
typo
typographical error

== U ==
undies
underwear
uni
university
unicam
(unicameral) legislature (Nebraska, United States only)

== V ==
vag, vadge
vagina
veg
vegetate
veg or veggie
vegetable
vegetarian or vegan
vet
veterinarian
veteran

== W ==
Westie
West Highland Terrier
Wisc
Wisconsin
women's lib
women's liberation

== X ==
xolo
xoloitzcuintli

== Y ==
Yank
Yankee
Yid
Jew (Yiddisher; offensive)

== Z ==
zep
zeppelin
Zin
Zinfandel
zinco
zincograph
zoo
zoological garden
