= Diminutives in Australian English =

Australian slang words

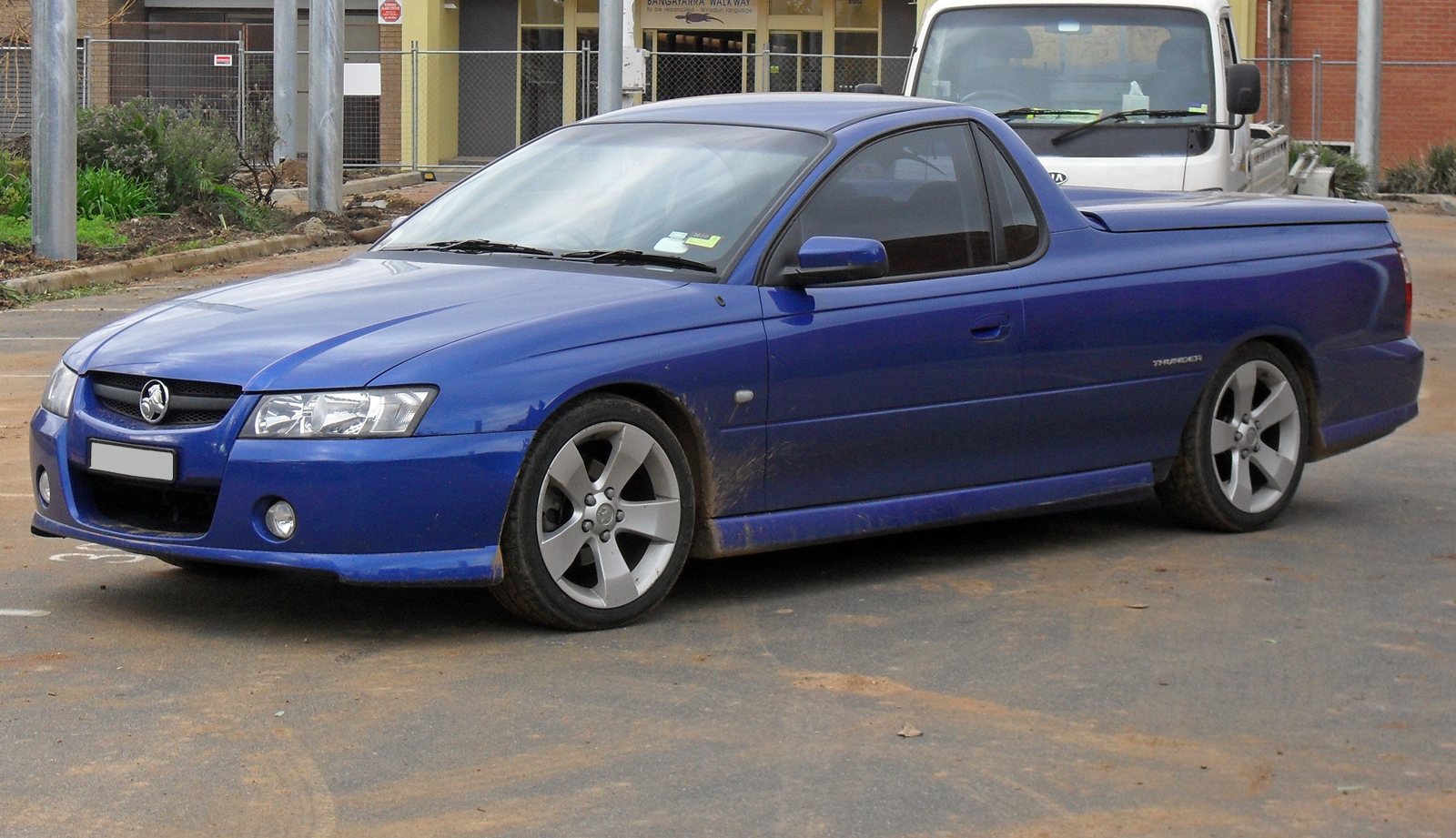
In Australian English, utility vehicles are almost always referred to in the diminutive as a ute.

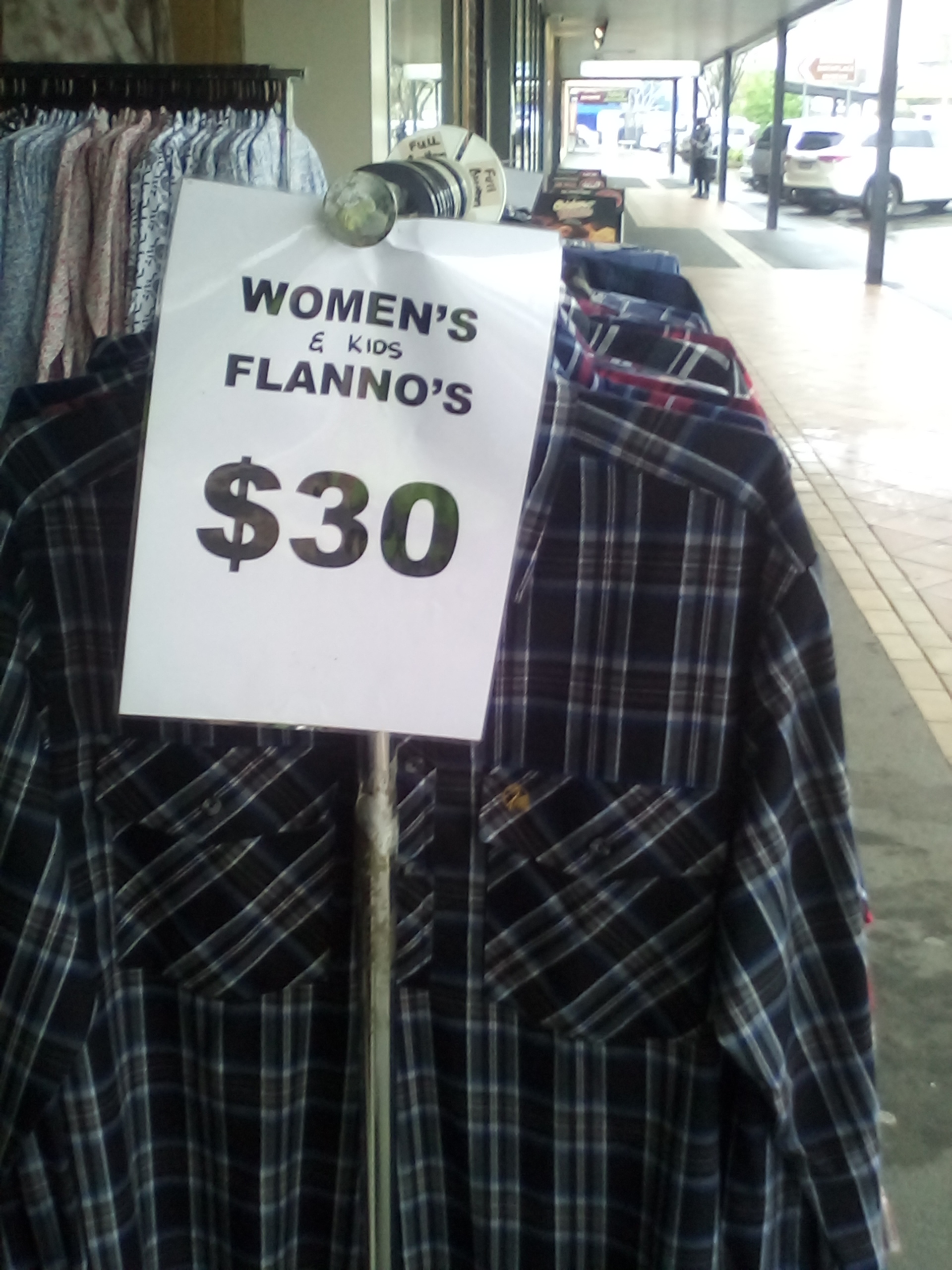
Flannelette shirts

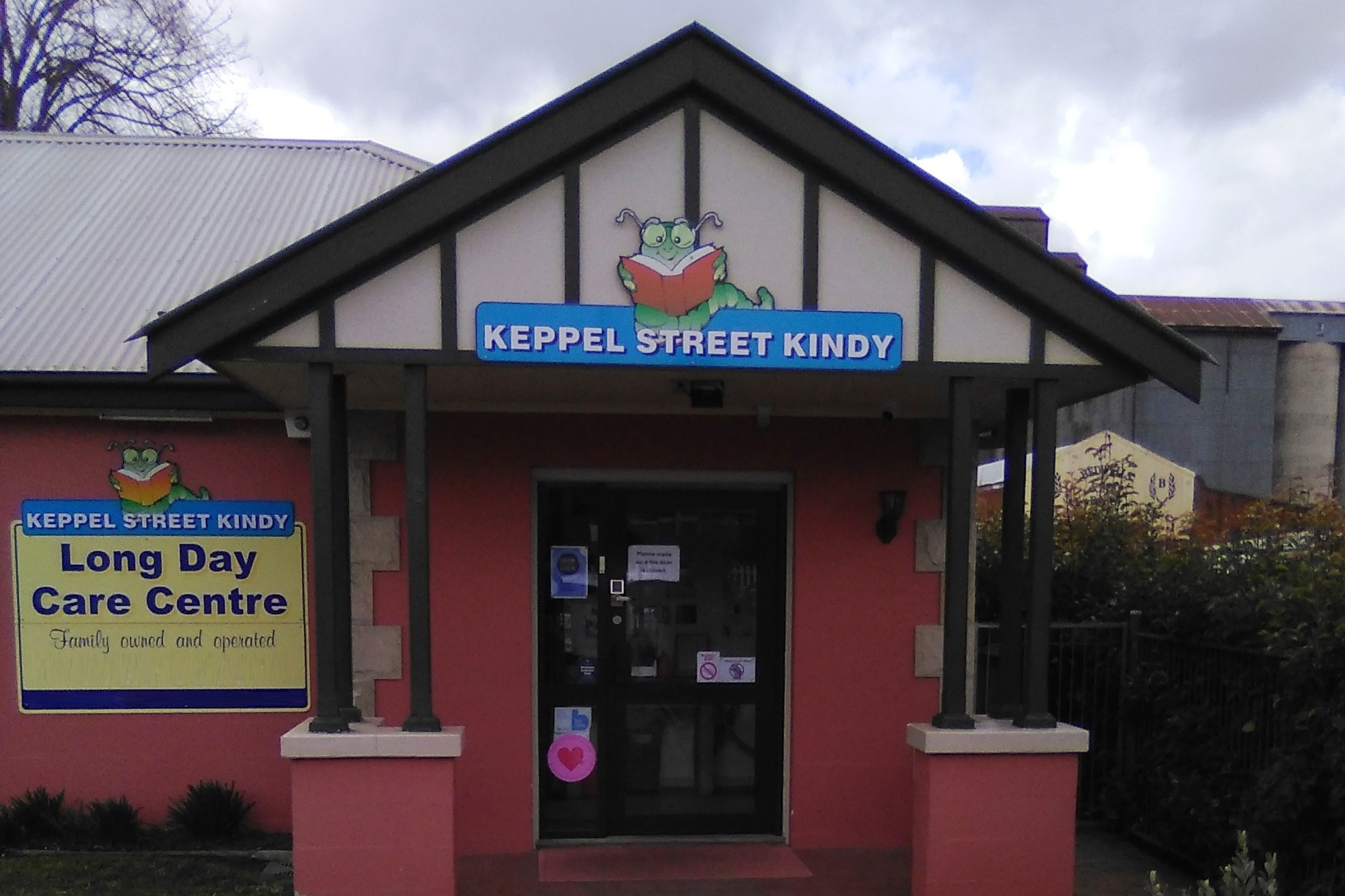
"Kindy" or child care centre

Diminutive forms of words are commonly used in everyday Australian English. While many dialects of English make use of diminutives and hypocorisms, Australian English uses them more extensively than any other. Diminutives may be seen as slang, but many are used widely across the whole of society. Some forms have also spread outside Australia to other English-speaking countries. There are over 5,000 identified diminutives in use in Australian English. A similar phenomenon also occurs in New Zealand English.

== Usage ==
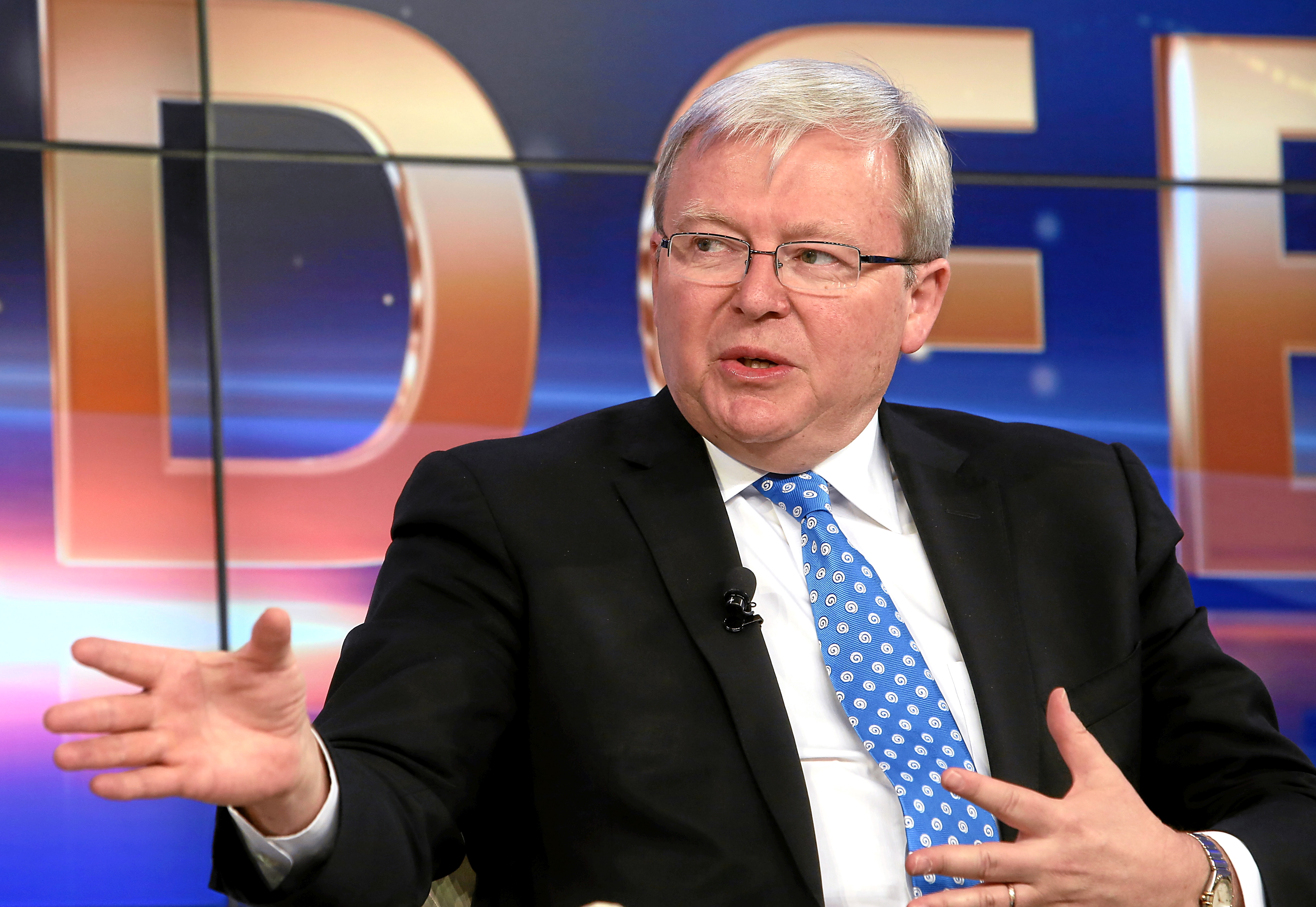
Former Australian Prime Minister Kevin Rudd is well known for using Australian colloquialisms such as diminutives.

In other English dialects, diminutives usually imply smallness or have a childish connotation such as in 'birdie', 'doggy', or 'kitty'. While diminutives can be used in this way in Australian English, they are also used widely in a non-childish manner, with over 4,300 being recorded. For example, bikie (a motorcycle, or motorbike club member), does not imply a bicycle in a small or childish sense as it may in other English dialects.

In Australian English, diminutives are usually formed by taking the first part of a word, and adding an ending such as a, o, ie, y, or s. Sometimes, no ending is added. Phonological changes may occur, such as the transformation of medial or final /ɹ/ into /z/, as in Sharon → Shazza. While the form of a diminutive is arbitrary, their use follows strict rules. Diminutives are not used creatively. For example, an ambulance paramedic is called an ambo, never ambie, or amba. Some diminutives are almost always used in preference to the original form, while others are rarely used or restricted to certain groups or locations. The use of diminutives also evolves over time, with new words coming into use and others falling out of favour. Some diminutives have become so common that the original form has fallen out of common usage. For example, Salvos has begun to replace the name Salvation Army to such an extent that some Australians do not recognise the Salvation Army name. Deli has become so universal that delicatessen is rarely used. Some words, such as ute, from utility vehicle, a car with a tray back, have become universal.

There is common usage of the diminutive forms of people's names; Hargrave → Hargie; Wilkinson → Wilko; John → Jonno; David → Davo; Hogan → Hoges; James → Jimmy → Jim → Jimbo; Benjamin → Ben → Benno; Barry → Bazza. This is usually a display of affection and acceptance rather than belittlement.

Organisations and businesses will often embrace the diminutives given to them by Australians, using them in their own advertising and even registering them as trademarks. McDonald's Australia, for example, has registered and uses the name Macca's, rather than the term McDonald's still seen on its restaurants in Australia.

Diminutives are often used for place names, and are only recognised by people in the local area, for example, Cot for Cottesloe Beach in Perth, Parra for Parramatta in Sydney and Broady for Broadmeadows in Melbourne. Even entire cities and States, such as Shepp for the major regional Victorian city of Shepparton or The Gong for the New South Wales coastal city/region of Wollongong or Tassie for the state of Tasmania.

Pub and hotel names in particular are often shortened. For example, the Esplanade Hotel in St. Kilda, will often be called The Espy.

== Purpose and history ==
The purpose of diminutives in Australian English is not well understood despite being a prominent part of Australian culture. Some research suggests that the use of diminutives serves to make interactions more informal, friendly and relaxed. Linguist Anna Wierzbicka argues that Australians' use of diminutives reflects Australian cultural values of mateship, friendliness, informality, and solidarity, while downplaying formality and avoiding bragging associated with tall poppy syndrome.

Records of the use of diminutives in Australian English date back to the 1800s. Older Australians tend to prefer diminutives with endings such as '-o' in smoko (a work rest break); however, younger Australians have begun to use endings such as -s as seen in totes (totally).

== List of diminutives ==
This list contains noteworthy and commonly understood diminutives from Australian English.

Those marked ‡ are also common in other English dialects.

=== A ===
- Abo or Abbo, an indigenous Australian. From Aboriginal. Considered offensive.
- Acca, academic (used in the academic field)
- Acca Dacca, rock band AC/DC
- Ag, agriculture
- Aggro, aggressive, aggravated or angry
- Albo, Anthony Albanese, 31st prime minister of Australia
- Alkie or ‡Alco, an alcoholic
- Ambo, an ambulance paramedic
- Apo or ape-o, from apeshit, meaning very angry or excited
- Arvo or (less commonly) Arvie, afternoon
- ‡Avo, avocado
- ‡Aussie, Australian

Back to top

=== B ===
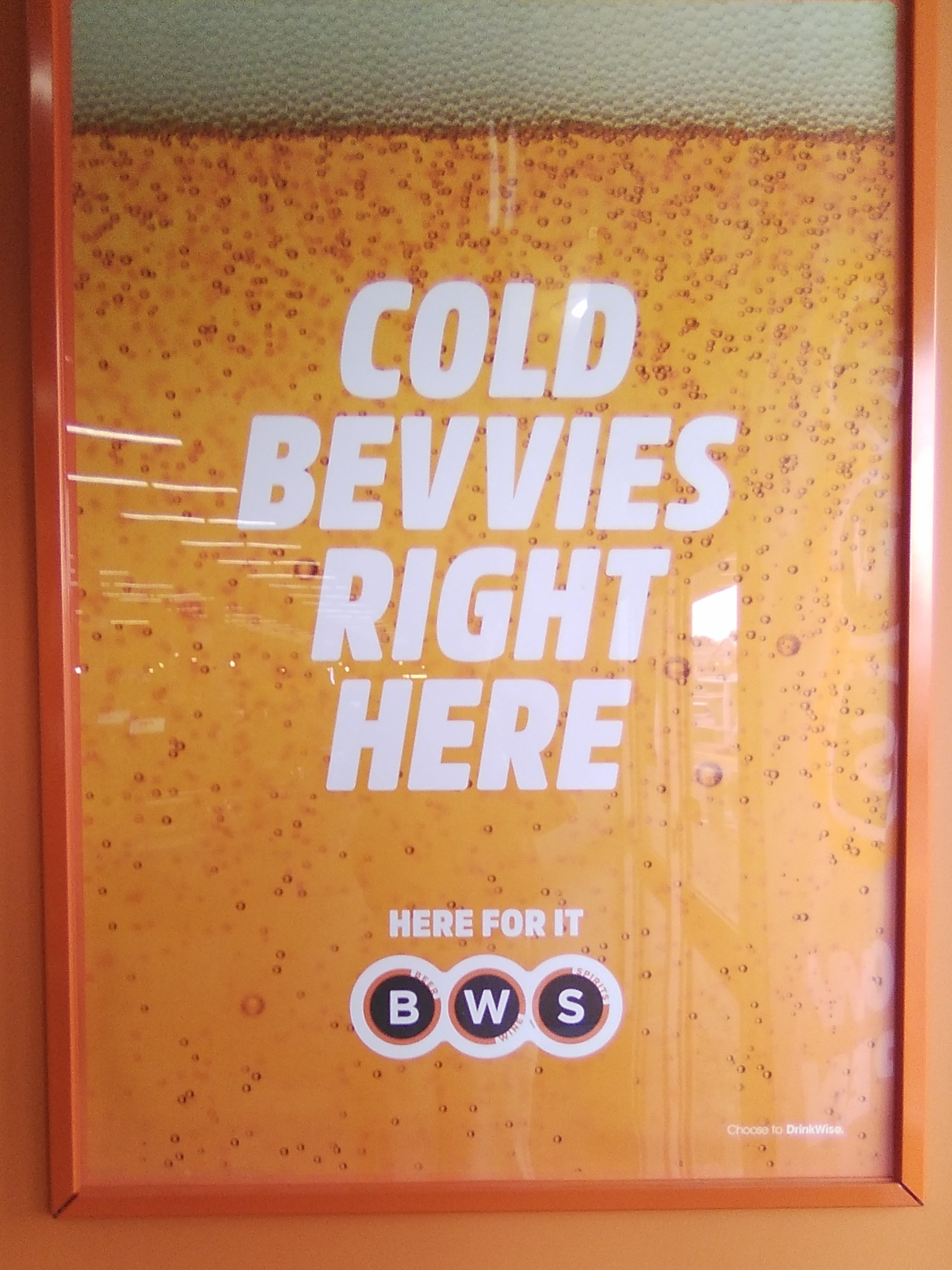
Not a common diminutive; marketing ploy by a chain of liquor stores

- Barbie, a barbecue, the cooking apparatus itself or the event of cooking food on a barbecue
- Barnesy, Australian singer Jimmy Barnes
- Barra, a barramundi, hence the Ford Barra engine built by Ford Australia
- Bazza, Barry (name)
- ‡Beauty, beaut, or bewdy, beautiful. Used in a much wider sense than the beauty, e.g. fantastic or excellent.
- Beeza, BSA brand of motorcycle (now historic)
- Belco, the district of Belconnen in the Australian Capital Territory
- ‡Berko, go berserk (e.g. he went berko) (also used in New Zealand)
- ‡Bickie, biccy or bikkie, a biscuit

- Big bickies, substantial sums of money

- Bidgie, the Murrumbidgee River
- Bikie, a member of a motorcycle club, with a connotation of involvement in criminal activity. This is equivalent to biker in other forms of English. A motorcycle club is called a bikie club. Outlaw motorcycle clubs may also be called bikie gangs.
- Blowie, a blowfly. A large buzzing fly common in Australia
- Blowy, fellatio, short for blow job
- Bluey, a blue heeler
- ‡Bolshie, from Bolshevik, meaning of a person or attitude, deliberately combative or uncooperative
- ‡Bookie, a bookmaker
- Boardies, boardshorts, worn by surfers
- Bottle-oh, (historical) a mobile bottle collector (for return and re-use)
- Bottle-o, a bottle shop or alcohol store (liquor store)
- Bowlo, a lawn bowls clubhouse
- ‡Brekkie or Brekky, breakfast
- Brissy (alternate spellings Brizzy, Brissie or Brizzie), Brisbane, the capital of Queensland.
- ‡Brickie, a bricklayer
- Broadie or Broady, Broadmeadows in Victoria, Broadbeach in Queensland
- Bruns, Brunswick Heads - town in Northern NSW
- Brushie, a brushtail possum
- ‡Bub, baby, as in "mum and bub"
- ‡Budgie, a budgerigar, a parakeet.

- Budgie smugglers – Men's swimming briefs

- Bundy, the city of Bundaberg, Queensland, or the Bundaberg Rum beverage
- Bunners, or Bunnos (when referring to Bunnings), the Bunnings chain of hardware stores, or the city of Bunbury, Western Australia
- Bushie, a bushman, one who is competent to live away from civilization (from bushman)
- Bushie, a bushranger
- Busso, the town of Busselton, Western Australia

Back to top

=== C ===
- Cabo, Caboolture, Queensland
- Cab Sav, Cabernet Sauvignon wine
- ‡Cardie, a cardigan
- Carby or carbie, a carburettor
- Cashies, the Cash Converters chain of stores, specializing in the buying and selling of second-hand goods.
- Cauli (pron. "collie"), cauliflower
- Ceno or Cenno, the Centrelink office. Also used to refer to a fortnightly payment (pension or otherwise) from the Centrelink office.
- ‡Champers, champagne
- Chardy, chardonnay wine
- Chewy, chewing gum
- Chockers, full to overflowing, derived from "chock-a-block"
- Chockie or Choccy, chocolate
- Chocko (from chocolate soldier), a member of the Australian Army Reserve
- Chrissie or Chrissy, Christmas
- Churchie, a church-goer (also used regarding students from Church of England schools)
- ‡Ciggie, a cigarette
- Cockie, a cockatoo. Commonly a sulphur-crested cockatoo. By extension, a farmer, e.g. "cow cockie" for dairy farmer. Also slang for cockroach
- Coldie, a cold can or stubby of beer, as in "crack a coldie"
- Connie, a bus or train conductor, a condom
- Coota, Cootamundra, also barracouta
- ‡Compo, compensation for being injured at work. Generally not used for other forms of compensation.
- Corro, corrugated iron or PVC conduit
- ‡Cossies or Cozzies, a bathing costume
- Cow Bombie, Cowaramup Bombora
- Cranie, a crane driver
- Croc, a crocodile
- Crownie, variously refers to Crown Lager or a Crown Prosecutor, the latter exemplified by the televisions series Crownies.
- ‡Cuppa, a cup of tea or coffee

Back to top

=== D ===
- Dandy, Dandenong
- Datto, a Datsun automobile
- Davo, David (name)
- Deckie, deckhand
- ‡Deli, a delicatessen
- Deffo, defamation (used in the legal field)
- Defo, definitely
- Delo, trade union delegate
- Dermo, Dermatitis
- Dero or derro, a derelict, a poor (often homeless) person, or location or building; also used as an adjective
- Devo, devastated, very upset over some event
- Deso, a designated driver
- Dexxy or Dexie, dextroamphetamine
- Diso, the disability pension, someone with a disability
- Dizzie, a car distributor, or an electrical distribution board
- Doco, a documentary
- Dodge, dodgy or suspicious
- Doley, someone on the dole (unemployment benefits)
- Doughie, the doughnut driving manoeuvre
- ‡Druggie or Druggo, illicit drug user
- Dunny, an outhouse, derived from dunnekin
- Durry, Duzz or Duzza, a cigarette, from the Bull Durham Smoking Tobacco brand

Back to top

=== E ===
- ‡Eckies, ecstasy. From the street name for MDMA.
- Ekka, exhibition. Used to describe the Brisbane Royal Show
- Erko, the Sydney suburb of Erskineville
- Espy, establishments named "Esplanade", such as the Esplanade Hotel, Melbourne or the Esplanade Hotel (Fremantle)
- Esky, a portable insulated container. From the Eskimo brand, which was later shortened to esky.
- Exy, expensive

Back to top

=== F ===
- Falsies, a heavily padded brassiere, or dentures (false teeth)
- Farnsy, Australian singer John Farnham
- Festy, festering, denoting something disgusting
- Firie, a firefighter
- Fisho, a fisherman or woman
- Flannie or flanno, a flannelette shirt
- Flatties, flat-soled (women's) shoes
- Flatty, a flat tyre, a slotted or "flat-head" screwdriver, or a Flathead (fish)
- ‡Footy, football, which may refer to the sport of football, the ball itself, or a specific game. Generally, footy refers to Australian Rules Football in Southern and Western States or Rugby league in Queensland and New South Wales. Association football is either called football or soccer, but never footy. Rugby Union is called rugby, never footy. The Nine Network runs two longstanding variety television shows called The Footy Show; one for Aussie Rules, and the other for Rugby League.
- Foxie, fox-terrier
- Freo, the city of Fremantle in Western Australia
- Freshie, a freshwater crocodile, or the Freshwater Beach in Sydney
- Fridgey or Fridgie, a HVAC technician
- Foo-ies, rock band Foo Fighters
- Forkie, a forklift operator
- Fourby, a four-wheel drive vehicle, derived from 4x4 ("four by four")

Back to top

=== G ===
- G Town, nickname for Geelong, Victoria
- The G, the MCG, or Melbourne Cricket Ground
- The Gabba, The Brisbane Cricket Ground, located in the suburb of Woolloongabba.
- Garbo, a garbage collector, Westfield Garden City in Brisbane.
- Gero, Geraldton, a town in Western Australia
- Geo, a Geologist
- Gladdy, the gladioli family of plants. The term was popularised by Barry Humphries in character as Dame Edna Everage
- Glenny, Glen Waverley, a suburb of Victoria
- The Gong, Wollongong, New South Wales
- Greenie, an environmentalist, from the green movement; usually pejoratively
- Greensie, Greensborough, a suburb of Melbourne
- Gossie, Gosford
- Gunners, the band Guns N' Roses
- Gunners, the district of Gungahlin in the Australian Capital Territory

Back to top

=== H ===
- Handy, a handjob
- Heckers, hectic
- Hoodie, hooded sweatshirt
- ‡Homo, homosexual (offensive)
- Hospo, hospitality
- Housos, (pron. –z–) residents of public housing
- Hundo, a one hundred dollar note
- Hypo, hyperactive

Back to top

=== I ===
- Indo, Indonesia
- Indro, Indooroopilly, a suburb in Brisbane
- Iso, isolation, gained popularity during the COVID-19 pandemic. Isopropyl alcohol

Back to top

=== J ===
- Jocks, men's briefs (underwear), esp. in phrase "socks and jocks"; from the brand name "Jockey"
- Jono, Johnno or Jonno, short for Jonathan or John.
- ‡Journo, a journalist
- Jindy, short for Jindabyne

Back to top

=== K ===
- Kanga, a kangaroo
- Kero, kerosene
- Kindy, Kinda or Kinder, kindergarten
- Kinger or kingie, a Holden Kingswood automobile, or the kingfish

Back to top

=== L ===
- Landy, a Toyota Land Cruiser or Land Rover automobile
- Lebo, or Leb, for Middle Eastern immigrant, specifically from Lebanon, sometimes pejorative.
- Lecky, electrical, as in "lecky tape" (Electrical tape)
- ‡Leftie, a person with left wing views; a left-handed person
- Lesbo or lezzo, a lesbian (offensive)
- Liftie, a ski lift operator
- ‡Limey, a person from the UK, prominently English (Not offensive but unfriendly)
- ‡Lippy, a lipstick
- ‡Lappy, a laptop computer
- Locko, covid lockdown or isolation
- Lonny, Point Lonsdale, Victoria
- ‡Loonie, a lunatic
- Lotto, the lottery

Back to top

=== M ===
- Maccas, McDonald's fast food restaurants This is also reflected in McDonald's corporate branding.
- Maggie, Australian magpie
- Melbs, Melbourne
- Metho or meths, methylated spirits; also Methodist
- Middy or middie, a mid-sized beer (half-pint).
- Mo, a moustache Contributed to the portmanteau "Movember".
- ‡Mong, an insult for someone implying that they are a mongoloid
- ‡Mozzie, mosquito
- Mullum, Mullumbimby, town in Northern NSW
- Murbah, Murwillumbah
- Mushie, mushroom
- Muso, a musician
- Muzzies or muzzos, a term for Muslims, sometimes pejorative
- Myxie or myxo, myxomatosis, in describing a rabbit so infected

Back to top

=== N ===
- Nasho, a conscript in the army. Derived from national service. Used especially around the Vietnam war. In the Army it was used in a derogatory sense. The term has fallen out of use as conscription in Australia ended in the 1970s. Common use is now Nationality
- Newie or Newy, Newcastle
- Nibblies, small portions of food nibbled on at parties

Back to top

=== O ===
- Op shop, opportunity shop

Back to top

=== P ===
- Parra, Parramatta
- Parma, Parmi or Parmy, chicken parmigiana, a pub food staple
- Paro or ‡Para, Paranoid. Also, extremely drunk (from paralytic).
- Pav, pavlova
- Penno, Pennant Hills
- Physio, physiotherapy or physiotherapist
- Pokey, pokies, (mostly as plural), a poker machine
- Pollie, a politician
- Pommie (adjective or noun), English or English person also Pom which may be used as a derogatory term (noun)
- ‡Postie, a postman or postwoman
- Povvo or Pov, a poor or cheap person. From poverty
- Preggo or ‡preggers, pregnant
- ‡Prezzies, gifts, presents; use widespread outside Australia
- Probs, probably, also used for problem in the phrase "no probs"
- ‡Prozzies, prostitutes
- Pushie, pushbike, a bicycle

Back to top

=== Q ===
- Queanie or Queany, the city of Queanbeyan

Back to top

=== R ===
- Ranga, from orangutan, slang for people with red hair
- "R"ie, also rissole, RSL clubhouse
- Reffo, a pejorative term for a refugee
- Rego, a vehicle registration
- Reno, a house renovation
- Reso, a reservation
- Reso tours, of resources in Western Australia
- Reso Train, "State Resources Train" in Victoria
- Ressie or Ressa, the suburb of Reservoir, Victoria
- Rellie or relo, a relative
- Reo, reinforcing steel, rebar
- Rivo, the suburb of Riverstone
- Rocko, the city of Rockingham, Western Australia
- Rocky, the city of Rockhampton
- ‡Rollie (pron. ROHL-ee), a roll-your-own cigarette
- Roo, a kangaroo
- Roofie, a roofer; also the date rape drug‡
- ‡Rottie, a Rottweiler dog
- Rotto, Rottnest Island

Back to top

=== S ===
- Saltie, a saltwater crocodile
- Salvos, Salvation Army. The term is used officially by the Salvation Army in Australia.
- Sanga or Sanger, a sandwich. Originally sango, but evolved to its current form by the 1960s.
- Sanny, hand sanitiser
- Sav, saveloy, especially battered sav, a showtime treat
- Savvy B, Sauvignon Blanc wine
- Scratchie, a lottery ticket
- ScoMo, self-identified by Scott Morrison, 30th prime minister of Australia
- Scrooge or screwge, a screwdriver
- Selfie, a self-shot photograph. This term originated in Australia and has been adopted worldwide via the internet. It became The Oxford Dictionary's 2013 word of the year.
- ‡Semi, a semi-trailer truck, also a semi-final
- ‡Seppo, a pejorative term for an American. Seppo is a diminutive of septic tank which is in turn rhyming slang for yank, which is a diminutive of yankee.
- Servo, a petrol station, service station
- Shazza, Sharon
- Shep or Sheppo, the Victorian regional city of Shepparton.
- Shoey, the act of drinking from shoes, typically alcoholic beverages
- ‡Shottie, a shotgun; also the act of riding in the front passenger seat of a vehicle, sometimes announced as "I call shotgun/shottie", to indicate that a person has claimed this seat. Can also refer to the carb hole in a bong.
- ‡Sickie, a sick day, often with a connotation of there being insufficient medical reason for missing work
- Sicko, a psychologically disturbed person‡, or someone who may be fanatically into horror movies
- ‡Smithy, Smith (surname), notably Charles Kingsford Smith
- Skato, a skatepark.
- Smoko, a smoking break while at work. Since smoking has been banned in many workplaces, a smoko has come to mean any rest break at work.
- Snag, Sausage
- Sparky or Sparkie, an electrician
- Spenny, expensive
- Stezza, a stereo playback system such as with home audio or vehicle audio
- Stubby or Stubbie, a small, wide bottle of beer
- Subbie, a subcontractor
- Subi or Subie, a Subaru car, or the suburb of Subiaco, Western Australia
- ‡Sunnies, sunglasses
- Surfie, a surfer
- Susso, from sustenance payments, a form of welfare during the Great Depression in the form of food coupons. The word has fallen out of use.
- ‡Susie or ‡Suzy, Susan
- ‡Suss, suspicious.
- Swaggie, a swagman

Back to top

=== T ===
- Taddie, tadpole
- Tanty, a tantrum
- Tassie, Tazzy or Taz, Tasmania or Tasmanian
- Techo, technician, technical (adjective)
- Tele, the Daily Telegraph, a Sydney newspaper, pronounced the same as

- ‡Tellie or telly, television

- ‡Tinnie, historically referred to a beverage can (usually a beer can) but today generally refers to an aluminium flat-bottomed boat; from tin can
- Tomo or Tommo, Thomas (name)
- Tonguey, to French kiss
- Toonie, Toongabbie, a historic suburb in Western Sydney
- Towie, tow truck or a tow truck driver
- Townie, a townsperson; in contrast to bushie, a bushman
- ‡Trackies, track pants or a tracksuit. Track pants are also known as "trackie dacks", with "dacks" being a colloquial term for trousers.
- Tradie, a tradesperson
- Traino, a train station
- Trannie or tranny, a car's transmission, or an electrical transformer, or an offensive word for a transgender person; also outdated slang for a transistor radio
- Troppo, from "tropics" as in "gone troppo", unhinged mentally (orig. army slang)
- Truckie, a truck driver
- Trumpie, Triumph brand of motorcycle
- Tuggers, the district of Tuggeranong in the Australian Capital Territory
- ‡Turps, alcohol, from turpentine, a toxic solvent historically used to adulterate gin. Usually used to say a person is "on the turps" (drinking heavily).
- ‡Typo, a typographic error

Back to top

=== U ===
- U-ey ,U'ie (you-eee), as in "Chuck a u-ey" — to perform a U-turn (when driving a vehicle)
- Umpie or Ump, an umpire at a sporting game
- ‡Undies, underwear. This word is used widely outside Australian English.
- ‡Uni, university
- Ute, an abbreviation of "utility"; a passenger vehicle with a cargo tray in the rear. Festivals that involve gatherings of utes are popular in rural areas and are called ute musters.

Back to top

=== V ===
- ‡Veggie or vegie, vegetables, generally not a vegetarian
- Veggo, a vegetarian, never a vegetable (also not used to refer to vegans)
- Vinnies, Society of Saint Vincent de Paul. The term is used by the society in Australia for branding its "op shops" (opportunity shops).

Back to top

=== W ===
- Wang, Wangaratta, Victoria
- Wedgie, wedge-tailed eagle, Aquila audax
- Westie, resident of a western suburb (several capital cities)
- Wharfie, a docks worker
- Wheelie, several car and bike manoeuvres — wheelstand or wheelspin; meaning found from context
- Winnie or Winnies, the Winfield brand of cigarettes, esp. "Winnie Blue", a low-tar variety
- ‡Wino, an alcoholic who subsists on cheap, probably fortified, wine
- ‡Woolies, Woolworths supermarkets
- Woollies, especially winter woollies, woollen garments

Back to top

== See also ==
- Apocope
- Hypocorism
- List of English apocopations
- Shibboleth
