= Nonce =

Nonce may refer to:

- Cryptographic nonce, a number or bit string used only once, in security engineering
- Nonce word, a word used to meet a need that is not expected to recur
- The Nonce, American rap duo
- Nonce orders, an architectural term
- Nonce, a slang term chiefly used in Britain for alleged or convicted sex offenders, especially ones involving children

== See also ==
- Nuncio, the apostolic and diplomatic representation of the Holy See
- Hapax legomenon, in corpus linguistics
