= Backformed =

Backformed may refer to:

- Backronym, i.e. a phrase made from initials, rather than vice versa
- Back-formation of one word from another, e.g. by removing what looks like a suffix
