= Back construction =

Back-construction may refer to the (somewhat related) terms:

- Back-formation
- Backronym
