= Sea of Tranquility (disambiguation) =

Sea of Tranquility (Mare Tranquilitatis) is a large, dark, basaltic plain on Earth's Moon.

Sea of Tranquility may also refer to:

== Literature ==
- Sea of Tranquility, a 2003 novel by Lesley Choyce
- Sea of Tranquility (novel), a 2022 novel by Emily St. John Mandel

== Music ==
- Sea of Tranquility, a 1984 album by Phil Coulter
- The Sea of Tranquility, a 2010 album by Neograss, or the title song
- "Sea of Tranquility", a song from Billy Cobham's 1974 album Total Eclipse
- "Sea of Tranquility", a song from Barclay James Harvest's 1977 album Gone to Earth
- "Sea of Tranquility", a song from Gordon Lightfoot's 1980 album Dream Street Rose
- "Sea of Tranquility", a song from Book of Love's 1988 album Lullaby
- "Sea of Tranquility", a song from Galactic Cowboys' 1991 self-titled debut album
- "Sea of Tranquility", a song from Siouxsie Sioux's 2007 album Mantaray

== See also ==
- Tranquility (disambiguation)
- Sea (disambiguation)
