= Antihecticum poterii =

Historical medicine

In pre-modern medicine, antihecticum poterii was a celebrated chemical preparation for use in hectic disorders. It was prepared by melting together one part each of tin and chalybeated regulus (the metallic form of antimony, impregnated with iron) in a large crucible, then gradually adding three parts potassium nitrate. When the reaction has run its course, the product is washed with warm water to remove traces of salt.

It was a very penetrating medicine, said to make its way into the minutest of passages, and searching even the nervous cells. It was used in treating heaviness of the head, giddiness, and dimness of sight, which proceeded apoplexies and epilepsies. In treating all afflictions and foulnesses of the viscera of the lower belly, it was believed inferior to nothing; for example, in treating jaundice, dropsies, and other malnourished states. It was regarded as superior in treating even the most obstinate chronic distemper (disturbance of the humour).

== See also ==
- Arcanum joviale, a similarly used preparation
