= Glossary of American terms not widely used in the United Kingdom =

This is a list of American words not widely used in the United Kingdom. In Canada and Australia, some of the American terms listed are widespread; however, in some cases, another usage is preferred.

- Words with specific American meanings that have different meanings in British English and/or additional meanings common to both dialects (e.g., pants, crib) are to be found at List of words having different meanings in British and American English. When such words are herein used or referenced, they are marked with the flag [DM] (different meaning).
- Asterisks (*) denote words and meanings having appreciable (that is, not occasional) currency in British English, but nonetheless distinctive of American English for their relatively greater frequency in American speech and writing. Americanisms are increasingly common in British English, and many that were not widely used some decades ago, are now so (e.g., regular in the sense of "regular coffee").
- American spelling is consistently used throughout this article, except when explicitly referencing British terms.

== 0–9 ==
101
(pronounced 'one o one') used to indicate basic knowledge; e.g., "Didn't you learn to sweep the floor in housework 101?" (from the numbering scheme of educational courses where 101 would be the first course in a sequence on the subject).
401(k)
(pronounced 'four o one kay') an employer-sponsored retirement plan in the United States. Derived from the section of the United States Internal Revenue Code authorizing such plans.
40
(pronounced 'forty') a 40-ounce (1.183L) bottle of malt liquor, commonly drunk by American youths.
411
(pronounced 'four one one') colloquial, information about something (from 4-1-1, directory assistance number) (UK: 118xxx or 192)
5-0
(pronounced 'five o') colloquial, the police (from Hawaii Five-O, an American television series)
501(c)
(pronounced 'five o one cee') a legally recognized non-profit organization in the United States, roughly equivalent to a Company Limited by Guarantee recognized by the Charity Commission as having charitable status in the United Kingdom. Derived from the relevant section of the Internal Revenue Code.
5150
(pronounced 'fifty-one fifty') colloquial, an involuntary psychiatric hold. Derived from California police code. (UK: sectioned)
529
(pronounced 'five twenty-nine' or 'five two nine') a tax-advantaged savings plan in the United States, similar to a 401(k), but instead used to fund the higher education expenses of the plan's beneficiary (usually the donors' child or grandchild). Derived from the relevant section of the Internal Revenue Code.
86
(pronounced 'eighty six') colloquial, to abandon, reject, or dismiss something or someone; e.g., "Let's eighty-six the whole thing." Similar to "Deep Six", although unlikely to have been derived from nautical terms as is "Deep Six". "86ing" someone can also mean ordering them to leave, as a bartender or bouncer to a rowdy or intoxicated patron.
911
(pronounced 'nine one one') the US' and Canada's emergency telephone number (UK: 999, European Union: 112)

== A ==
acclimate
(verb) (UK usually: acclimatise)
acetaminophen (or the brand name Tylenol)
(UK: paracetamol)
affirmative action
providing opportunities in education or work based on race or gender (UK: positive discrimination)
airplane
a powered fixed-wing aircraft. Alteration of UK aeroplane, probably influenced by aircraft
aluminum
(UK: aluminium)
amtrac
Landing Vehicle Tracked, military vehicle used in World War II (not to be confused with Amtrak, the passenger railroad corporation)
arroyo
a usually dry creek. Spanish in origin.
arugula, rugola
the herb also known as rocket or garden rocket. Borrowed from southern Italian dialect in the early 1960s ("Ask Italian greengrocers for arugula, rucola or ruccoli; ask other markets for rouquette, rocket salad or, simply, rocket." — The New York Times, May 24, 1960, in OED).
automobile
a car

== B ==
baby carriage
pushable vehicle for transporting babies, also called stroller, buggy or regionally baby coach (UK: perambulator (very old-fashioned or formal), pram, or, for the type that an older baby sits rather than lies in, pushchair)
baby shower (or just "shower")
party with gifts to celebrate an impending birth (less common in the UK)
bachelor party / bachelorette party
a party held for a man (bachelor) or woman (bachelorette) soon to be married (UK: stag night/hen night)
bachelorette
a young, single woman who has never married
backhoe
a piece of excavating equipment (UK usually digger, mechanical digger, excavator, or JCB, genericized trademark)
baker-acted
to be placed under an involuntary psychiatric hold. Derived from Florida's Baker Act. (UK: sectioned)
ballpark
a baseball stadium; used to mean an approximation ("in the ballpark"; "a ballpark figure")
Band-Aid *
(trademark) bandage for minor wounds, (UK: plaster [DM], Elastoplast (trademark)); also, a makeshift solution
bangs
front part of the hair cut to hang over the forehead (UK: a fringe)
barrette
hair slide
baseboard
skirting board
bayou
(from Louisiana French) an often marshy slow-moving minor watercourse, usually located in a low-lying area (as in the Mississippi River delta region of the southern United States)
bedroom community
a commuter town or suburb (UK: dormitory town [DM])
bear claw
A kind of sweet pastry served throughout the United States, named for its large, clawlike shape.
bell pepper
a mild (not spicy) red or green pepper or capsicum in Australian English and Indian English
bellhop
a hotel porter
beltway
a ring road, or orbital motorway found around or within many cities.
big-box store
a large retail establishment built on one level, typically with few, if any, windows.
blacktop
a road surface [DM] composed of asphalt concrete; also a verb ("to blacktop a parking lot") (UK: compare tarmac)
bleachers
the raised open air tiered rows of seats (stands) found at sports fields or at other spectator events
blinders
(on a horse) (UK: blinkers)
blood sausage
black pudding
boardwalk
a walkway usually made of planking, typically along a beach (as that of Atlantic City) (UK: promenade)
bobby pin
hair grip, Kirby grip
bodega
a Spanish term for a winery. A convenience store, especially in a Spanish-speaking neighborhood.
booger
(slang) a piece of coagulated nasal mucus (UK: bogey)
bookmobile
a large vehicle housing a mobile lending library (UK: mobile library)
boombox
a large portable stereo, syn. with ghettoblaster, which is also American in origin but is common in the UK.
boondocks
(also the boonies) rough country; a very rural location or town; backwoods; the "sticks". Sometimes refers to rough, poor neighborhoods in a city. From Tagalog.
boondoggle
slang term for a scheme that wastes time and money; originally a braided ornamental cord or leather strap
Botts' dot
see raised pavement marker
breadbox
a box for storing bread (UK: bread bin)
broil
to cook food with high heat with the heat applied directly to the food from above (UK: grill) [DM].
brownstone
a type of residential building found in Boston, New York City, and other large cities
bullhorn
a megaphone, sometimes used to refer to a portable airhorn
burglarize
to carry out a burglary (UK: burgle; burgle is very rare in US, and burglarize virtually nonexistent in UK)
burlap
cloth made from jute or sisal, traditionally rough and used to make rope and sacks (UK: hessian)
busboy
junior restaurant worker assisting waiting staff, table clearer, water pourer etc.
butte
an isolated hill with steep sides and a small flat top

== C ==
caboose
a railroad car attached usually to the rear mainly for the crew's use (UK: guard's van or brake van)
Canadian bacon
Back bacon (bacon made from center-cut boneless pork loin). Also ham, usually pressed and sliced like bacon.
candy apple, candied apple
toffee apple
canola
a type of rapeseed that produces an edible oil (originally a trademark, of Canadian origin (from Canada and oleum 'oil'))
careen
(of a vehicle) to travel fast and out of control, usually swerving or cornering (UK: career)
carhop
someone serving food at a drive-in, often on rollerskates
catercorner
(or catercornered, catacorner, kitty-corner, catty-corner, etc.) (adverb) diagonally, diagonally opposite ("The house looks catercorner to mine"). Cater corner is the original form (from the French quatre and English corner = four + corner), but the forms kitty corner and catty corner (folk etymology) are usual in speech, catty corner especially in the North and West, and 'kitty corner prevailing in the Midwest and South. Sometimes (dialectal, regional) also kitty/catty wampus/wumpus (unclearly derived), which can also mean "awry", or "skew-whiff".
catsup
alternative spelling of ketchup that rarely sees use in the UK.
cell phone, cellphone, cell
(short for cellular telephone) a portable telephone; UK: mobile phone, often abbreviated to mobile Used in the UK in the early years of mobile telephony.
certified mail
recorded delivery
ChapStick *
(trademark, sometimes used generically) a lip balm
charge account
in a store or shop (UK: credit account)
checkers
a popular board game (UK: draughts)
checking account
the type of bank account used for drawing checks; distinguished from savings account. (UK: current account or cheque account; use of cheques is now much less common in the UK)
cilantro
(from Spanish "cilantro") coriander leaf, while in the US, coriander refers only to the seed.
cleats
in the context of field sports, athletic shoes with studded soles used for football or soccer (UK: Football boots, rugby boots)
cloture
a motion in legislative or parliamentary procedure that brings debate to a quick end; especially used by and in the United States Senate (UK: closure)
conniption (fit)
(slang) temper tantrum.
co-ed, coed
female student at a coeducational college (e.g., "He saw the party as an opportunity to meet co-eds."); any group of people with members from both genders (e.g., "My soccer team is co-ed.")
comfort station
a public toilet
condo
colloquially, any owned (as opposed to rented) apartment (UK: flat); more strictly such an apartment or house with common areas controlled by and charged for by a homeowner association; short for condominium (England and Wales: commonhold)
cookout
informal meal cooked and eaten outdoors, a cross between a picnic and a barbecue or a cooking competition taking place outdoors
cooties
fictional disease, a term used by children (UK: germs, lurgy); also a term for lice
copacetic
fine and dandy; good; well; A-OK; cool. Creole, perhaps from the French "Comme c'est sympathique"
costume party
party where costumes are worn (UK: fancy-dress party)
cotton candy
spun sugar often sold at fairs (UK: candy floss)
counterclockwise
(UK: anti-clockwise)
coveralls
a one-piece outer protective garment (UK: overall, boiler suit)
crapshoot
risky and uncertain venture; from craps, a dice game
cremains
the remains of a dead body after cremation (UK: remains, ashes)
criminy, crimony
a mild oath or to express surprise; perhaps alteration of jiminy, gemini; probably euphemism for Late Latin Jesu domine ("Jesus Lord!") (UK: crumbs, etc.), of Christ or from Italian crimine (crime)
critter
(informal) a creature; sometimes a term of endearment

== D ==
deplane
to disembark from an aeroplane
deputy or sheriff's deputy
A paid county law enforcement official working for an elected sheriff; roughly equivalent to a police constable in the UK.
derby
/ˈdɜːrbi/ historically, a hat worn by men (UK: bowler)
diaper
An absorbent undergarment (UK: nappy)
dime
a 10-cent coin. Derived from the Old French word disme (the original spelling), meaning a tenth part or tithe, and ultimately from the Latin decima. Can also mean a ten dollar quantity of an illegal drug (or dime bag). Five-and-dime, dime store, a store selling cheap merchandise; a dime a dozen, so abundant as to be worth little (UK: ten a penny); on a dime, in a small space ("turn on a dime", UK: turn on a sixpence) or immediately ("stop on a dime", UK: stop on a sixpence); nickel-and-dime, originally an adjective meaning "involving small amounts of money" and then "insignificant", also a verb meaning "to rip-off by many seemingly insignificant charges" (the nickel [DM] is the 5-cent coin). In Britain, the old sixpence, a small coin of a comparable size and value (2 1/2 new pence), is still used in similar expressions despite being replaced when a decimal currency was introduced in 1971.
direct deposit
a method of payment by bank transfer, similar to European giro, almost exclusively used for deposits of pay checks or government benefits
discombobulated
to be confused or disconcerted; (UK and US: discomposed) Sometimes now used with conscious, self-mocking irony by generally more formal British speakers.
dishrag
a cloth for washing dishes (UK and US: dishcloth)
dishwashing liquid
a liquid soap used for washing dishes (dishsoap) (UK: washing-up liquid)
dish towel
a towel for drying dishes (UK: tea towel)
district attorney
state or city public prosecutor (UK: Crown Prosecutor (England and Wales); Procurator Fiscal (Scotland))
divided highway
a road with a highway median/central reservation (UK) (UK: dual carriageway)
docent
a university lecturer; also a volunteer guide in a museum or similar institution
doohickey
word used for an unknown item. (a thingamajig, thingamabob, or just a thingy) (UK: wotsit)
douche or douchebag *
an insult for a contemptible person (from the device for rinsing the vagina or anus)
downspout
pipe for carrying rainwater from a gutter to the ground (UK & US: drainpipe)
downtown*
(noun, adv., adj.) (in, to, toward, or related to) either the lower section or the business center of a city or town—(used in UK but more common expression would be city centre or CBD)
drape, drapes
(UK and US: curtain)
driver license, driver's license
(UK: driving licence)
drugstore
a pharmacy, or a store selling candy, magazines, etc. along with medicines (UK approx.: chemist or "corner shop" [DM])
druthers
preference of one thing over another derived from a contraction of "I would rather" or "I'd rather" (e.g., "if I had my druthers, I'd...")
drywall
gypsum board, plasterboard, or any process that builds interior walls without the use of water (UK: plasterboard)
dude *
A man; a dandy; a city-dweller visiting a ranch. Often used to address a man.
Dumpster
(trademark: might be becoming genericized) large trash receptacle (UK approx.: skip [DM]); to dumpster-dive, to rummage through a Dumpster
dweeb
a boring, studious or socially inept person (a nerd, a geek or a "drip" an old-fashioned mild pejorative for someone exceptionally eccentric or lacking in social skills)

== E ==
eggplant
the plant Solanum melongena (UK: aubergine);
elephant ear
Deep fried dough covered with cinnamon-sugar. Commonly found at fairs and carnivals.
emergency brake
brake in motor vehicle operated by a lever used to keep it stationary. Also referred to as an "E-brake". (UK and US: handbrake)
eminent domain
the power of the government to take private property for public use (similar to UK compulsory purchase)
English muffin
(UK: "muffin", "hot muffin")
envision *
to envisage
eraser *
(UK: rubber [DM])
exclamation point *
(UK: exclamation mark)
expressway
a type of limited-access road (UK: motorway)
exurb
the ring of prosperous rural communities beyond the suburbs, see commuter town

== F ==
fanny pack
pouch-like bag that ties or snaps around the wearer's waist (UK: bum bag). In the UK 'fanny' is a vulgar slang term for the vulva and thus this word could be considered rude.
faucet
valve for controlling the flow of a liquid (UK and US: tap [DM])
FICA
(rhymes with "Micah") payroll tax used to fund Social Security and Medicare (similar to UK National Insurance). Derived from the law authorizing such taxation, the Federal Insurance Contributions Act.
flack
publicist or press agent; sometimes also an alternate spelling of flak "negative commentary", which is used in the UK. Although flack "press agent" was first recorded just one year after flak "anti-aircraft fire" (from German Fliegerabwehrkanone "aircraft defence cannon"), the two are likely unrelated.
flashlight*
portable battery-powered electric lamp (UK: usually torch)
flatware
knives, spoons, and forks (as opposed to holloware); (UK usually cutlery [DM]
freeway
(see article) (UK: motorway)
French press
device for making coffee (UK: cafetière)
freshman
first-year student in college or high school (fresher in UK)
French fries (or fries) *
pieces of potato that have been deep-fried. (UK: chips [DM]; "French fries" is known via American fast food chains, due to which it usually refers to the thin, crispy variety of chips served there)
frosting
confection applied to cakes (US and UK: icing)
front desk
(UK: reception)
frosh, see freshman
frybread (or fry bread)
flatbread fried in oil or animal fat which is a staple food of American Indians

== G ==
garbage
(UK: rubbish)
garbage can
(UK: dustbin or simply bin)
gasoline
(abbreviated gas; esp. in the past also spelled gasolene) (UK: petrol)
gee whiz *
as an interjection, an old-fashioned expression of admiration, surprise or enthusiasm (a euphemism for "Jesus"); as an adjective, denotes something characterized by or meant to cause excitement or sensation ("gee-whiz technology"; "a gee-whiz attitude")
general delivery
(UK: poste restante)
get-go (git-go)
the very beginning (of something); e.g. "I warned them right from the get-go."
GFCI (Ground Fault Circuit Interrupter)
(UK: Residual-current device (RCD), or colloquially, breaker or circuit breaker) A safety device attached to consumer mains power supplies to prevent accidental electrocution and/or damage to connected equipment.
green thumb
(UK: green fingers)
grifter
a con artist, transient swindler, or professional gambler (US and UK: con man); also grift can mean an act of thievery or trickery
gotten
Past participle of "get" (got in most of the UK); "gotten" is however of British origin, still retained in some older dialects, and is sometimes now used again under US influence. In American English there is a distinction in usage: "gotten" is used to refer to the process of acquisition, obtainment or to having entered a state over a matter of time, whereas "got" signifies possession.
grits
A maize (sweetcorn) porridge common in the southern U.S. and relatively unknown in the UK
ground beef
(UK) minced beef, or just mince
grunt
Slang for infantryman: (UK: squaddie)

== H ==
half bath
a room for personal hygiene that lacks a shower or bathtub (i.e. a bathroom [DM], in the American sense of the term, which lacks a place to actually bathe). Equivalent to a British W.C..
half-staff
the placement of a flag below the summit of a ship mast, a pole on land, or a pole on a building (UK: half-mast)
hard candy
(UK: boiled sweets)
heavy cream
double cream (UK)
hickey
a bruise on one's skin resulting from kissing or sucking (UK: love bite)
highball
an alcoholic drink made with a spirit, particularly whisky, and water, soda water or any carbonated beverage, served in a tall glass with ice
ho
Shortened form of the word "whore", also used as a derogatory term for any woman. The pronunciation and spelling is from African-American Vernacular English and certain non-rhotic varieties of Southern American English that have the dough-door merger.
hobo
tramp; homeless, unskilled, itinerant worker; subculture of wandering homeless people, particularly those who make a habit of hopping freight trains.
hoecake
A coarse cake of maize flour.
hominy
maize kernels that have been soaked in a caustic solution then coarsely ground; see also grits
play hooky
to play truant from school; to cut class (UK also: skive, bunk off or playing wag or wagging off or mooching)
horseback riding
simply "riding" or horse riding in the UK
howdy
(short for how do you do) casual greeting that originated in the Southern States. (UK How do?)
hush puppy
a bite-sized ball of deep-fried cornmeal batter commonly eaten in southern America. (Non-existent in the UK, where "Hush Puppies" denotes the international brand of shoes of that name)
HVAC
Heating + Ventilating (or Ventilation) + Air Conditioning; often pronounced "H-vack". (used in technical circles in the UK, where such systems are less common than in the US due to differences in climate)

== I ==
intimate apparel
lingerie; used mainly in advertisements.

== J ==
jack off, jerk off *
(slang) to masturbate; UK usage would be "to wank". If used as a disparaging noun, as in "that guy is such a jackoff [or jerkoff]", the UK equivalent would be "wanker" or "tosser". In this sense, sometimes written "jagoff", though this probably has a different derivation.
jackhammer
(UK: pneumatic drill)
Jane Doe
See John Doe.
jaywalking
crossing or walking in the street or road unlawfully. There is no equivalent concept in UK law.
jeez
minced oath for "Jesus", sometimes spelled geez
jerk someone around
to unfairly delay, stymie, thwart or cause confusion, sometimes with the intent to defraud.
Jell-o
(trademark) gelatin dessert (UK: jelly [DM])
john
(slang) a toilet; also, the client of a prostitute
johnson
(slang) penis (US and UK : willy)
John Doe
unnamed defendant or victim (as in a lawsuit or a suspected murder), or a person whose identity is unknown or is intended to be anonymous; also, an average man; compare John Q. Public (UK equivalent is Joe Bloggs, or John Smith). The female equivalent is Jane Doe, or less frequently "Jane Roe" as in Roe v. Wade. Also Baby Doe.
John Hancock
a signature (from the name of the President of the Second Continental Congress, who was the first signer of the United States Declaration of Independence and wrote his signature the largest)—"put your John Hancock here". "John Henry" is also seen, using Hancock as a perceived homophone of "Hank", a common nickname of Henry. (UK: monicker.)
John Q. Public
the common man, typical member of the general public. Also stated as Joe Public, Joe Blow, Joe Schmoe, Joe Six-Pack, Eddie Punchclock, or Joe Lunchbucket. (UK: Joe Bloggs, Joe Public)

== K ==
kitty-corner, caddy-corner, also catty-corner
see catercorner

== L ==
ladybug
a red, black-spotted beetle (UK: ladybird)
laundromat
a public place to wash laundry (UK: laundrette or launderette)
layer cake
(UK: sandwich cake or (in the context of cakes) sandwich
learner's permit
a restricted license for a person learning to drive, who has not yet passed the necessary driver's test (rules vary from state to state); also called driver's permit or temps (Temporary Permit) (UK: provisional driving licence)
left field *
a notional source of unexpected or illogical questions, ideas, etc. ("that proposal came out of left field") Defined by the Merriam-Webster online American dictionary as having American baseball-related origins
(the) Lower 48
used mainly by Alaskans, this is a colloquialism for the 48 Contiguous United States. The more general term Outside may be used for any part of US territory outside Alaska, such as Hawaii or Puerto Rico as well.
license plate*, license tag
vehicle registration plate (UK: number plate)
lumber
wood used for commercial purposes (UK timber)
lunch meat
another term for luncheon meat (UK and US)

== M ==
mail carrier, mailman
a person who delivers mail to residences and businesses; also letter carrier (UK and US: postman, postwoman, although the term "postal worker" is encouraged so as to remain gender-neutral)
main street
The principal street of a small town or city, on which most of its retail businesses are situated, or a metaphor for smaller cities and/or small businesses in general. The phrase "Wall Street vs. Main Street" (or variants thereof) is sometimes used to make the distinction between big and small business (UK: usually high street, although main street is commonly used in Scotland).
mass transit
(UK: no equivalent, but the broader public transport comes close)
math
mathematics (UK: maths).
maven
expert, guru; from Yiddish.
midsize
medium size
Miranda
(Miranda warning) the warning (usually "You have the right to remain silent. If you give up that right, anything you say can and will be used against you in a court of law." etc.) given to criminal suspects before interrogation; (Miranda rights) the rights stated in the warning, as established in the United States Supreme Court case Miranda v. Arizona; hence mirandize, to recite the Miranda warning to (a criminal suspect). In the UK this is referred to as "reading rights" or "cautioned as to his rights" (not to be confused with a police caution).
mohawk
a type of haircut (UK: mohican)
mom, momma, mommy, also mama*, mamma
mother (UK often: mum[my], mam, ma)
mom-and-pop
single-family operated small business ("a mom-and-pop store") (UK and US: family business)
mono / mononucleosis
(UK: glandular fever)
mortician
(UK and US: undertaker, funeral director)
moxie
courage, daring, and energy as in "This guy's got moxie!" (from an advertisement for an American soft drink from Northern New England)

== N ==
narc / nark
law enforcement narcotics agent; but 'to narc on' someone is to inform on them to an authority figure, used also as a noun labeling a person who does such (UK and New Zealand: grass)
New York minute
(colloquial) an instant, a very short time period
night crawler
earthworm or worm
nightstand
encompassed by bedside table
nightstick
historically, a police officer's weapon (UK: truncheon)
nix
nothing; to cancel or disallow
normalcy
normality. Used, although not coined, by President Warren G. Harding ("a return to normalcy", Harding's 1920 presidential campaign slogan)

== O ==
obligated
(archaic or dated in UK; UK and US: obliged)
obstruction of justice
(England and Wales: perverting the course of justice; Scotland: defeating the ends of justice)
off-the-rack
clothes bought straight from a store (UK: off-the-peg)
oftentimes *
often (archaic in Britain but colloquial in America, especially clause-initially)
ornery
irritable, crotchety, cranky, troublemaking (from ordinary); very mild and may situationally be used affectionately
overpass *
(UK and US: flyover)

== P ==
pantyhose
(UK: sheer tights) In the U.S. "tights" is used for similar non-sheer garments; "pantyhose" refers only to sheer or semi-sheer nylon-based tights
paper route
a regular series of newspaper deliveries (UK: paper round)
parking garage
multi-storey car park
parking lot
a usually outside area for the parking of automobiles (UK: car park)
penitentiary
prison; gaol/jail.
penny-ante
(adj.) petty, insignificant—from penny ante, poker played for a very low ante
person of color
a person who is not white. See also colored. (UK: BAME)
plastic wrap
thin, clear plastic used for covering or wrapping food (UK: cling-film)
Plexiglas
Trade name for Poly(methyl methacrylate) (PMMA), a transparent thermoplastic sometimes called "acrylic glass" (UK: Perspex)
plumber's butt or plumber's crack
buttock cleavage, also called the working man's smile (UK: builder's bum, brickie's bum or builder's cleavage)
plushie, plush toy
soft toy (UK: cuddly toy). Also in the U.S.: stuffed animal, not to be confused with a dead animal mounted by a taxidermist.
Police lineup
(UK: identity parade)
Popsicle
A trademarked brand of frozen juice, or flavored ice on a stick. The term is widely used to describe all such confections without regard to brand. (UK: ice lolly)
porch pirate
Person who steals packages from unsuspecting customers' porches or front door areas.
powdered sugar
(UK: icing sugar)

== R ==
rain check
used metaphorically to indicate that the person cannot accept the current invitation but would like to be invited to a future event. Stores may give a coupon to purchase the item later at the advertised price. Originated in the US as a coupon given to a baseball ticket-holder when a game was cancelled because of rain; it would entitle the holder to attend a replacement game for no charge.
railroad
(UK and US: railway). Also, to send someone to prison without a fair trial.
raised pavement marker
commonly called reflector, Botts' dot or cat's eye (UK: cat's eye)
rambunctious
excessively boisterous
rappel
to descend on a rope (UK: abseil)
real estate
(UK: property or land)
Realtor (trademark)
member of the National Association of Realtors; as a genericized trademark, any real estate broker or real estate agent (UK: estate agent)
restroom
a toilet, particularly a public one.
RIF, RIF'd
abbreviation for Reduction In Force; i.e. to be honorably discharged from employment (UK: redundancy, made redundant, laid off *, paid off)
roil
to render muddy by stirring up the dregs of; as, to roil wine, cider, etc., in casks or bottles; to roil a spring; also, to disquiet or disturb (also rile in the sense of "to anger", riled up for "angry")
roustabout
an unskilled laborer, especially at an oil field, at a circus, or on a ship. Used in the oil industry in the UK.
rowhouse
(UK: terraced house)
Rube Goldberg device
Absurdly complex machine (UK: Heath Robinson device)
rutabaga
the turnip Brassica napus napobrassica (UK: swede)
RV (recreational vehicle)
see article for usage of the terms RV, motor home, and the British camper [DM] and caravan [DM]
RV park
(UK: caravan site or less usually caravan park)

== S ==
Saran wrap
(trademark) plastic wrap. Increasingly genericized without regard to brand. (UK: cling film)
sawbuck
sawhorse; also a ten dollar bill (so named because some designs incorporated the Roman number ten, or "X", which resembles a sawhorse)
scads
great amounts
scallion *
also used in Ireland; also known as spring onion in Great Britain and the US
scalper
ticket tout
Scotch-Irish
(North) Americans who are identified as having descended from Scottish people who settled in Northern Ireland and Irish Protestants; also Scots-Irish (UK: Ulster Scots)
Scotch Tape
(trademark) sticky tape (UK: Sellotape [trademark])
scuttlebutt
gossip, rumor; originally meant water fountain (UK: rumour)
self-rising flour
self-raising flour
shill *
a person pretending to a member of the general public to lend credibility or excitement to a confidence scheme; e.g., a person who claims to have received benefit from snake oil. Recently popularized in the UK by eBay ("shill bidding" or bidding to drum up excitement with no intention of buying). The UK equivalent to a shill would be a "plant", from having someone "planted" in an audience or amongst bystanders. The term "plant" is equally used and understood in the United States.
shredded cheese
grated cheese
shuck
the husk of an ear of corn (maize), an oyster shell, etc.; used in plural to mean something worthless or as an interjection ("shucks!"); (verb) to remove the shuck; also, to discard, get rid of, remove ("I shucked my coat")
shyster*
A lawyer or accountant of dubious ethical standards. This phrase commonly indicates a person with no ethical restraints. (From German Scheisser (shitter, defecator, unpleasant person, bastard) or a disreputable US lawyer named Scheuster)
sidewalk
usually paved path for pedestrian traffic, often constructed of concrete or less usually of stone (UK: pavement [DM], footpath [DM], legally footway)
sidewalk superintendent
someone spectating a construction or demolition job (UK: bystander [DM])
skim milk
(UK: skimmed milk)
skosh
a little bit. See also List of English words of Japanese origin
s'more
(usually pl.) A camp fire treat consisting of a roasted marshmallow and a slab of chocolate sandwiched between two pieces of graham cracker. Contraction from "some more"
sneaker
(usually pl.) a form of footwear, also called tennis shoe or "gym shoe"—see regional vocabularies of American English (UK: trainer, plimsoll, regional dap, pump, [DM])
snuck
colloquial past tense and past participle form of "sneak" (US standard and UK: sneaked)
soccer
used in the UK but the sport is mainly known as "football" (or fully as association football); historically most common among the middle and upper classes in the UK (i.e. outside the game's traditional core support base); more common in Ireland to avoid confusion with Gaelic football. In the US, an unqualified reference to "football" would normally be understood to mean American football.
soda fountain
(see article)
soda pop
(UK: soft/fizzy/carbonated drink [with CO_{2}, e.g. Coca-Cola], pop)
sophomore
a second-year college or high school student (Trinity College Dublin has sophister in this sense); (adj.) the second in a series (as in, an athlete's "sophomore season", a band's "sophomore album")
specialty *
(UK: speciality, though specialty is used in law and medicine)
special election
(UK: by-election)
spelunking
exploring caves for fun: (UK and US: caving)(UK: potholing)
spring break
an extended holiday or party for students occurring during March and April (UK: Easter holiday)
spyglass
a telescope or set of lenses used to observe subjects at distance (once common in UK usage, but now only in dialect)
station wagon
an automobile with extended rear cargo area (UK: estate (car))
steam shovel
a large mechanical excavator (UK: digger or JCB (genericized trademark))
steno (short for "stenographer")
(UK: shorthand typist)
stickshift, stick
(car with) manual transmission, as opposed to an automatic (UK and US: gear stick or gear lever for the stick; manual for the car)
stool pigeon, stoolie
police informer (UK: grass) (from the use of captive birds as hunting decoys)
stop light
(UK and US: traffic light)
streetcar
vehicle on rails for passenger transportation [DM] usually within a city; also called trolley [DM] or trolley car if electrically powered by means of a trolley (UK: tram)
strep throat
a sore throat caused by Streptococcus
stroller
vehicle for baby transportation featuring the child in a sitting position, usually facing forward (UK: pushchair, buggy [DM])
SUV *
Sport-Utility Vehicle. A 4×4 ("four by four") in the UK; in the US "4×4" usually refers to a four-wheel drive pickup truck
sweatpants
(UK: track bottoms, tracksuit bottoms)

== T ==
tailpipe
exhaust pipe
takeout
(UK: takeaway; Scotland and US also carry-out)
teeter(-totter), teeterboard
(UK and US: a seesaw)
telecast
to broadcast by television
teleprompter
(see article) (UK: compare autocue)
thru*
Through. An abbreviation mostly used in the fast food industry, as in Drive Thru. Also used in traffic signs ("Thru Traffic Keep Left"; i.e., traffic that is continuing through an interchange rather than exiting should keep to the left) and occasionally road names ("New York State Thruway") and sometimes in newspaper headlines. Seen in the UK at McDonald's, Burger King etc.
thumbtack
short nail or pin with a large, rounded metal head suitable for driving in by hand (UK: drawing pin)
track and field meeting * (track meet)
(UK usually athletics meeting [DM]); see also track [DM]
trackless trolley
a trolleybus; see trolley in [DM]
trash
rubbish, waste. Originating in Middle English and used by Shakespeare, the term fell from use in Britain. See also "garbage"
trashcan
(UK: dustbin, rubbish bin, bin)
travel trailer
(UK: caravan)
turn signal
direction-indicator lights (UK usually indicators; US and UK also blinkers [DM])
two-bits
literally, worth 25 cents or a quarter (a bit is an eighth of a dollar); figuratively, worth very little, insignificant (informal). (UK: two bob, but almost obsolete and more common in London and the south-east; likewise Mickey Mouse).
two cents, two cents' worth
an opinion, a piece of one's mind (as in, "I'm gonna go down there and give him my two cents") - (UK similar: two pence, two penneth, two penn'orth or tuppence worth)

== U ==
undershirt
an upper undergarment with no collar, and with short or no sleeves, worn next to the skin under a shirt (UK: vest [DM], semmit in Scotland and Northern Ireland)
upscale
relating to goods targeted at high-income consumers (UK: upmarket)
uptown
(noun, adj., adv.) (in, to, toward, or related to) either the upper section or the residential district of a city; e.g., in Manhattan, New York City the term refers to the northern end of Manhattan, generally speaking, north of 59th Street; see also Uptown, Minneapolis; Uptown, Chicago; Uptown New Orleans; compare downtown. Often has implications of being a desirable or upscale neighborhood. However, in Butte, Montana and Charlotte, North Carolina, "Uptown" refers to what would be called "downtown" in most other cities.

== V ==
vacationer
someone taking a vacation [DM] (UK: holidaymaker)
vacay
informal shortening of vacation (comparable to UK hols)
vajayjay
(slang) vagina
variety meats
offal
varmint or varmit
(UK and US: vermin)

== W ==
washcloth
(UK: flannel, UK often and US less frequently facecloth; US less frequently also washrag)
washrag
See washcloth
wastebasket
synonym for trash can, especially one intended for light waste (UK: wastepaper basket)
weatherization*
weatherproofing of buildings, occasionally used in the UK but would be spelled weatherisation
windshield
the front window of an automobile (UK: windscreen)
winningest
superlative of adjective winning; having most wins or championships (especially in sporting contexts)
wiseguy
a mobster; also smartass (e.g., "hey, wiseguy…")
woodsy
abundant in trees, suggestive of woods; woody, wooded

== Y ==
y'all
(regional — Southern American, African-American, and Appalachian) contraction of You all, used as second-person dual or plural pronoun. (e.g., "Hey, are y'all coming to the dance?") Also all y'all, comparable in meaning and register to north-English, Northern Irish and Scottish "youse, yous".
yellow light
as in the color at a stoplight (q.v.) or traffic lights (UK: amber)
yinz, yunz, you'uns
(Western Pennsylvania, especially Pittsburgh) plural you; derived from you ones. Likewise youse in Philadelphia.

== Z ==
zee
name of the last letter of the English alphabet (UK: zed)
zilch
nothing, zero
zinger
a witty, often caustic remark; something supposed to cause surprise or shock
ZIP code
(for Zone Improvement Plan) the postal code used by the United States Postal Service composed of 5 digits as in 90210, sometimes a suffix of 4 digits after a hyphen is used. (UK equivalent: postcode or post code or rarely postal code)
zipper *
(UK usually zip [DM])
zucchini
the plant Cucurbita pepo, also zucchini squash (UK: courgette, closely related to the larger marrow)

== See also ==
- List of words having different meanings in British and American English: A–L
- List of words having different meanings in British and American English: M–Z
- List of British words not widely used in the United States
