= Neograss =

Norwegian progressive rock band

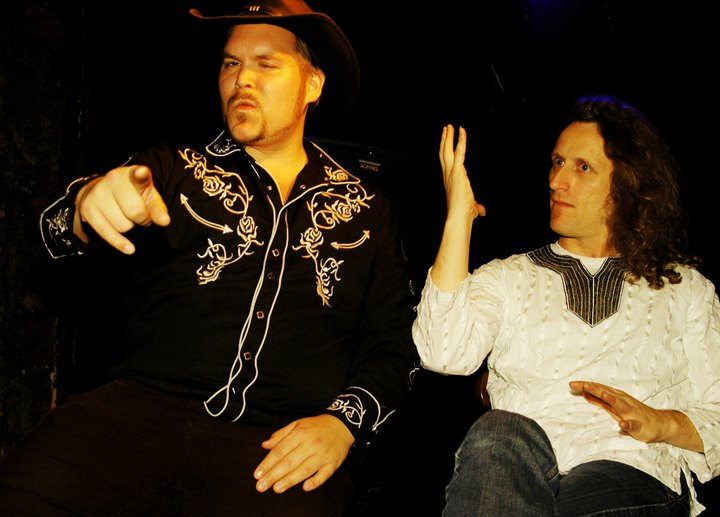

Background information
- Origin: Tromsø, Norway
- Genres: Progressive rock, ambient, bluegrass
- Years active: 2010–present
- Labels: TMA Music, Eb Music
- Members: Emil Bekkevold; Tore-Morten Andreassen; Åsmund Wilter Eriksson; Aleksander Kostopoulos; Benjamin Mørk; Kjetil Andreassen
- Website: www.neograss.net

Neograss is a progressive rock band from Norway, formed in 2010 with members Emil Bekkevold (banjo, vocals), Tore Morten Andreassen (guitar, mellotron), Benjamin Mørk (mellotron/piano/keyboards) Åsmund Wilter Eriksson (double bass) and Aleksander Kostopoulos (drums). The latter two are also known from the Sami group Adjágas. Neograss released their debut album "The Sea of Tranquility" in August 2010, where they try to blend two very seemingly so different genres: bluegrass and prog rock.

== History ==
Neograss was originally formed in 2006 by Emil and Tore-Morten as a pure bluegrass band called "Neograss Unit". They were soon reinforced with Åsmund and Aleksander, and started adding progressive elements like mellotron and china-cymbals. This resulted in a namechange and the release of "The Sea of Tranquility" in 2010. Benjamin Mørk (mellotron/piano) joined the band for their second release, "Smokey Reeds the Bandit" in 2011, an album where they pay tribute to the late Jerry Reed.

=== Silent film ===
During TIFF's Silent Film Days 2011 at "Verdensteatret" in Tromsø, Neograss and the thrashmetalband Defender kicked off the festival with a newly written soundtrack to the silent film "The Lost World". This concert was released as a livealbum in 2012.

=== Superstition ===
In February 2012 Neograss themed up with Tromsø Chamber Orchestra and recorded the album "Overtru fra Yttersia" (superstition from the coast), an album where they tell the tales and myths from the northern part of Norway about Draugen, Nøkken and Hulder. This is the first album sung in their native language.

== Discography ==
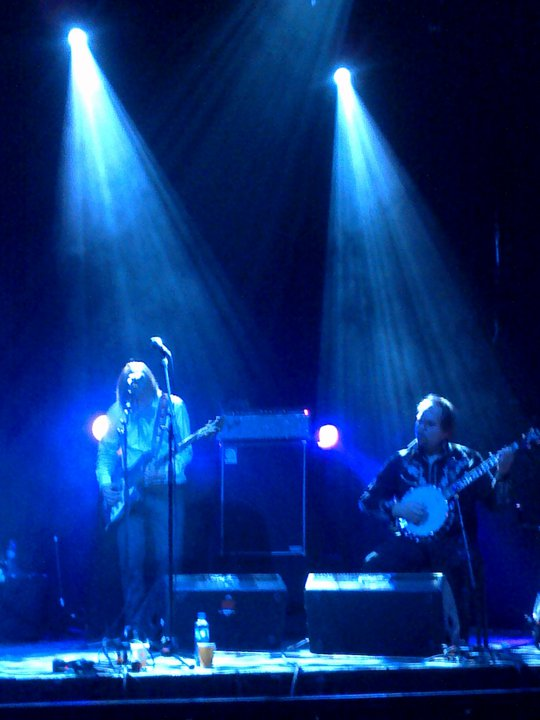
Åsmund and Emil 2011

=== Studio albums ===
- The Sea of Tranquility (2010)
- Smokey Reeds the Bandit (2011)
- Atlantis (2011)
- Overtru fra Yttersia (2012)
- Draumkvedet (2015)
- Talisman (2021)

=== Live albums ===
- Neograss & Defender – The Lost World (2012)
- Live in Tromsø 2012 (2012)

=== Other ===
- Future Soundscapes (Holistic Remix) (single – 2012)
- Legenden (Holistic Remix) (single – 2012)
- Snowman (single – 2013)

== Line-up ==
- Emil Bekkevold (vocals/banjo/dulcimer/willow flute)
- Tore-Morten Andreassen (guitar/mellotron)
- Åsmund Wilter Eriksson (double bass)
- Aleksander Kostopoulos (drums)
- Benjamin Mørk (mellotron/piano/keyboard)
- Kjetil Andreassen (guitar)
