= Arcanum joviale =

Pre-modern medical preparation

Arcanum joviale, in pre-modern medicine, is a preparation made of an amalgam of mercury and tin, digested in spirit of nitre. The nitre being drawn off, the remaining matter is wetted with spirit of wine, and the spirit burnt away. This is repeated several times till the pungent taste is gone. What remains was used much with the same intentions as antihecticum poterii, and was recommended by some as a sudorific.
