= Tranquility (disambiguation) =

Tranquility or tranquillity is state of being calm, serene, and worry-free.

Tranquility or tranquillity may also refer to:

== Places ==
- Tranquillity, California, U.S.
- Tranquility, New Jersey, U.S.
- Tranquility, Ohio, U.S.
- Tranquility Base, where Apollo 11 landed on the moon
- Tranquillity Park, Downtown Houston, Texas, U.S.
- Tranquillity Valley, Pensacola Mountains, Antarctica

== Other uses ==
- tranquility (video game)
- Tranquility (ISS module), a module of the International Space Station
- Tranquility (Lee Konitz album), 1957
- Tranquility (Ahmad Jamal album), 1968
- Tranquility (yacht), a superyacht
- USS Tranquillity (AH-14), a U.S. Navy hospital ship
- Tranquility (novel), a 2001 novel by Attila Bartis

== See also ==
- Tranquil (disambiguation)
- Sea of Tranquility (disambiguation)
