= List of English back-formations =

Back-formation is either the process of creating a new lexeme (less precisely, a new "word") by removing actual or supposed affixes, or a neologism formed by such a process. Back-formations are shortened words created from longer words, thus back-formations may be viewed as a sub-type of clipping.

Each back-formation in this list is followed by the original word from which it was back-formed.

== A ==
- abduct probably from abduction
- abscess (v.) from abscessed
- aborigine from aborigines, mistaken for a plural noun
- accord (n.) from Old French acorde, acort, a back-formation from acorder
- accrete from accretion (root: accrescere)
- acculturate from acculturation
- addict from addicted (root: addicere)
- admix from admixt
- Adirondack Mountains from Adirondacks, mistaken for a plural noun
- adsorb from adsorption
- adolesce from adolescence
- adulate from adulation
- advect from advection
- advisor perhaps from advisory
- aerate (meaning "expose to air") probably from aeration
- aesthete from aesthetic
- aggress from aggression
- air-condition from air conditioning
- alley
- alliterate from alliteration
- allotrope from allotropy
- amaze from Middle English amased
- ambivalent from ambivalence
- ameliorate perhaps from amelioration in some cases
- annunciate perhaps from annunciation in some cases
- anticline from anticlinal
- antipode from antipodes (non-standard)
- appeal (n.) from Old French apel, back-formation from apeler
- apperceive (in modern psychological use) from apperception
- aristocrat from French aristocrate, a back-formation from aristocratie
- assent (n.) from Old French assent, a back-formation from assentir
- attrit from attrition
- auto-destruct from auto-destruction (cf. auto-destroy)
- automate from automation
- aviate from aviation
- avid partly from avidity
- awe-strike perhaps from awestruck

== B ==
- babysit from babysitter
- back-form from back-formation
- bartend from bartender
- beg from beggar
- benefact from benefactor (and also the derived benefactee, cf. benefactor)
- berserk from berserker
- bibliograph from bibliography
- bicep from biceps (non-standard)
- biograph from biography
- bird (verb) from bird watcher
- blockbust from blockbuster
- book-keep from book-keeping
- brainwash from brainwashing
- bulldoze from bulldozer
- bum possibly from bummer
- burgle from burglar
- bus ("to clear dirty dishes from table") from busboy
- bushwhack from bushwhacker
- buttle from butler

== C ==
- cadge from cadger
- caretake from caretaker
- cavitate from cavitation
- chain-smoke from chain-smoker
- chalant from nonchalant
- Chess (river) from Chesham
- choate from inchoate
- choreograph from choreography
- chupacabra from Spanish chupacabras (both a plural and a singular in Spanish)
- claustrophobe from claustrophobia
- cohese from cohesion (disambiguation) (cf. cohere)
- commentate from commentator
- committal from non-committal
- complicit from complicity
- computerize from computerized
- contracept from contraception (cf. rare contraceive)
- contrapt from contraption
- convect from convection
- conversate from conversation or conversing
- cose from cosy
- couth from uncouth
- co-vary from covariation
- cross multiply from cross multiplication
- cross-refer from cross-reference
- curate (verb) from curator
- custom-make from custom-made

== D ==
- dapple from dappled
- darkle from darkling
- decadent from decadence
- deconstruct from deconstruction
- dedifferentiate from dedifferentiation
- demarcate from demarcation
- demograph from demographics
- destruct from destruction
- diagnose from diagnosis
- diffract from diffraction
- dinge from dingy
- diplomat from diplomatic
- dishevel from disheveled
- donate from donation
- drear from dreary
- drowse from drowsy (possibly a backformation)
- dry-clean from dry cleaning

== E ==
- eave from eaves
- eavesdrop from eavesdropper
- edit from editor (from Latin stem edere, to bring forth)
- electrocute from electrocution
- elocute from elocution
- emote from emotion
- enthuse from enthusiasm
- escalate from escalator
- eutrophicate from eutrophication
- evaluate from evaluation
- extradite from extradition
- extrapose from extraposition

== F ==
- fine-tune from fine tuning
- flab from flabby
- flappable from unflappable
- flake ("eccentric person") from flaky
- floss ("to show off") from flossy
- fluoresce from fluorescence
- fragmentate from fragmentation
- free-associate from free association (backformed adjective-verb compound)
- funk (quality of music) from funky

== G ==
- gamble from gambler
- gestate from gestation
- ghostwrite from ghostwriter
- gid from giddy
- gladiola from gladiolus
- gnarl from gnarled
- goaltend from goaltender
- godsend from god-sent
- greed from greedy (the noun was originally "greediness")
- grid from gridiron
- grovel from groveling
- grunge from grungy
- gruntle from disgruntle

== H ==
- handwrite from handwriting
- hard-boil from hard-boiled
- hawk (meaning "to sell") from hawker
- haze from hazy
- headhunt from headhunter
- headquarter from headquarters
- helicopt from helicopter
- herptile (a reptile or amphibian) from herpetology
- herpe (a single herpes sore) from herpes
- housebreak from housebroken
- houseclean from housecleaning
- housekeep from housekeeper
- hustle from hustler

== I ==
- inadvertent from inadvertence
- ideologue from ideology
- incent from incentive
- indice from indices (cf. index)
- injure from injury
- intercept from interception (possibly a backformation)
- interfluve from interfluvial
- interlineate from interlinear
- intuit from intuition
- isolate from isolated

== J ==
- jell from jelly
- jerry-build from jerry-built

== K ==
- kidnap from kidnapper
- kudo from kudos (some commentators regard it non-standard)

== L ==
- lase from laser
- laze from lazy
- legislate from legislator
- letch from lecher
- liaise from liaison
- loaf (meaning "to be idle") from loafer
- logroll from logrolling
- luminesce from luminescent

== M ==
- manipulate from manipulation
- mase from maser
- mentee from mentor
- mix from mixt (adj. from Old French, misconstrued as past participle of verb)
- mottle from motley
- moonlight (the verb, work on second job) from moonlighter
- multimillion from multimillionaire

== N ==
- nake from naked
- nitpick from nit-picking
- notate from notation

== O ==
- obsess (meaning "to behave obsessively") from obsessive
- obligate (as a verb meaning "oblige") from obligation
- one-up or one-upman from one-upmanship
- orate from oration
- orientate from orientation

== P ==
- panhandle (meaning "to accost") from panhandler
- paramedic from paramedical
- partake from partaker
- patriation from repatriation
- pea from Middle English pease
- peddle from peddler
- peeve from peevish
- pettifog from pettifogger
- phosphoresce from phosphorescent
- pleb from plebs
- ply from reply
- preempt from preemption
- process from procession
- prodigal from prodigality
- proliferate from proliferation
- proofread from proofreader
- pugn from impugn

== Q ==
- quadrumvir from quadrumvirate
- quantitate from quantitative

== R ==
- raunch from raunchy
- recurse from recursion
- reminisce from reminiscence
- resurrect from resurrection
- ruly from unruly
- rotovate from rotovator

== S ==
- sass (impudence) from sassy
- scavenge from scavenger
- sculpt from sculptor
- secrete (meaning "to produce and emit") from secretion
- secretive from secretiveness
- sedate (the verb) from sedative
- self-destruct from self-destruction (cf. self-destroy)
- semantic (adjective) from semantics
- sharecrop from sharecropper
- shoplift from shoplifter
- sightsing from sightsinging
- sightsee from sightseeing
- sipid from insipid
- sleaze from sleazy
- sleepwalk from sleepwalking
- smarm from smarmy
- sorb from sorption (also a back-formation)
- soft-land from soft landing (backformed adjective-noun compound)
- sorption from adsorption and absorption
- spectate from spectator
- stargaze from stargazer
- statistic from statistics
- stave (the noun) from staves (the original singular is staff)
- steamroll from steamroller
- stridulate from stridulation
- suburb from suburban
- suckle from suckling
- sulk from sulky
- summate from summation
- sunburn (the verb) from sunburned
- superannuate from superannuated
- surreal from surrealism
- surveil from surveillance
- swashbuckle from swashbuckler
- swindle from swindler
- syncline from synclinal

== T ==
- tamale, as a singular of tamales (plural form of tamal)
- tase from Taser
- taxon from taxonomy
- televise from television
- tongue-lash from tongue-lashing
- transcript (verb) from transcription (cf. verb transcribe)
- tricep from triceps (non-standard)
- trickle-irrigate from trickle-irrigation (possibly backformed from verb-noun compound but may also be verb-verb compound)
- tweeze from tweezers
- typewrite from typewriter

== U ==
- underwhelming as a supposed antonym of overwhelming
- unit from unity
- upholster from upholstery
- ush from usher

== V ==
- vaccinate from vaccination
- vend as in vend out (meaning to contract out to a vendor), derived from vendor
- verse from versus
- vinify from vinification
- vint (meaning to make wine) from vintage and vintner
- vivisect from vivisection

== W ==
- wiretap from wiretapper
