= Tranquilizer (disambiguation) =

A tranquilizer is a drug that induces tranquility.

Tranquilizer may also refer to:

- "Tranquilizer", a song written by Tom Stephan with vocals by Neil Tennant, from album Superchumbo "WowieZowie" (2005)
- "Транквилизатор" ("Tranquilizer"), a song by the Soviet band Кино (Kino) from the album Nachalnik Kamchatki (1984)
- Tranquilizer (album), an album by Oneohtrix Point Never
- "Tranquilized", a song by Acid Bath from When the Kite String Pops

== See also ==
- Tranquil (disambiguation)
- Tranquillity
- Sedative
- Tranquillizer gun
