= Choate (law) =

Term used in American law

"Choate" (/ˈkoʊət/, /ˈkoʊeɪt/; COE-ut, COE-ait), as used in American law, means "completed or perfected in and of itself", or "perfected, complete, or certain".

The word became the subject of many discussions after United States Supreme Court associate justice Antonin Scalia admonished an attorney for using the word during oral argument at the high court as if it were an antonym of "inchoate", claiming that the word did not exist.

American linguist and lexicographer Ben Zimmer argues that, although faulty, its use among lawyers has been documented since at least 1828, and it was used by Oliver Wendell Holmes Jr., among other legal luminaries of the 20th century. It is included in most legal dictionaries and lexicons; however, Black's Law Dictionary editor-in-chief Bryan Garner essentially agrees with Scalia. Nonetheless, Garner admits its common acceptance and use within the legal profession. In IRS v. McDermott, 507 U.S. 447 (1993), Scalia quoted a 1954 precedent, "but substituted [no longer inchoate] for choate".

"No longer inchoate" is a phrase used in other contexts as well to convey a more exact meaning. Antonyms listed by the Merriam-Webster Dictionary for "inchoate" are "adult", "full-blown", "full-fledged", "mature", "ripe", and "ripened".

"Choate" has been used in several legal contexts, for example, any "choate right is an undefeatable right that is totally valid and ... totally free from encumbrances", and a "choate lien is ... certain and definite". Such a lien is a perfected security interest as used in the U.S. Federal Bankruptcy Code and Uniform Commercial Code. In the context of reference to liens, rights in equity, and inchoate crimes, it has been used as the antonym of inchoate.

== Etymology ==
The term choate is a back-formation from the word "inchoate" that dates from 1534, meaning "in process of formation". Because the prefix "in-", meaning "not", frequently is used to create antonyms, superficially the relationship of the two words seems to make sense. However, the Latin origin of "inchoate", the verb incohare, begins with a different use of the prefix "in-", wherein the prefix denotes "within". Hence, "inchoate" was not derived from "choate", but the reverse has occurred with apparent misunderstanding of the Latin source, leading to its being challenged as an incongruent word.
