= Glossary of British terms not widely used in the United States =

This is a list of British words not widely used in the United States.

- Words with specific British English meanings that have different meanings in American and/or additional meanings common to both dialects (e.g. pants, cot) are to be found at List of words having different meanings in American and British English.

== A ==
abseil
to descend on a rope (US rappel)
Action Man
the action figure toy sold in the US as G.I. Joe.
afters
dessert, informal
amongst
a synonym of among acceptable in British English while seeming old fashioned or pretentious in American English
argy-bargy
(informal) a noisy disagreement ranging from a verbal dispute to pushing-and-shoving or outright fighting.
as at
(before dates) on a particular date

== B ==
barmy
(archaic) crazy, unbalanced (US: balmy)
barney
a noisy quarrel, trouble; origin unknown.
barrister *
In England, Wales, and Northern Ireland, this used to be the only type of lawyer qualified to argue a case in both higher and lower law courts; contrasts with solicitor. For Scotland, see advocate. Occasionally used in the U.S., but not to define any particular type of lawyer.
berk, burk or burke
a mildly derogatory term for a fool or stupid person. An abbreviation of either 'Berkshire Hunt' or 'Berkeley Hunt', rhyming slang for cunt.
big girl's blouse
a man or a boy who behaves in a way which other men think is how a woman would behave, especially if they show they are frightened of something
bint
a condescending and sometimes derogatory term for a woman (from the Arabic for 'daughter'). Usage varies with a range of harshness from 'bitch', referring to a disagreeable and domineering woman, to only a slightly derogatory term for a young woman.
block of flats
a large building divided into flats (apartment building in U.S.)
bobby
police officer, named after Sir Robert Peel, the founder of the Metropolitan Police in 1829. The word "peeler" of similar origin, is used in Northern Ireland.
Bob's your uncle
"there you go", "it's that simple". (Some areas of US have the phrase Bob's your uncle, Fanny's your aunt)
bod
a person
bollocks
(vulgar; originally ballocks, colloquially also spelled as bollox) testicles; verbal rubbish (as in "you're talking bollocks") (US: bullshit). The somewhat similar bollix is found in American English, but without the anatomical connotations or vulgar sense meaning 'mess up'. The twin pulley blocks at the top of a ship's mast are also known as bollocks, and in the 18th century priests' sermons were colloquially referred to as bollocks; it was by claiming this last usage that the Sex Pistols prevented their album Never Mind the Bollocks from being banned under British obscenity laws. Related phrases include bollocksed, which means either tired ("I'm bollocksed!") or broken beyond repair; bollocks up, meaning to mess up ("He really bollocksed that up"); and [a] bollocking, meaning a stern telling off. Compare dog's bollocks, below
bonce
head (informal)
botty, bot
a person's bottom (informal or childish)
brass monkeys
cold – from "cold enough to freeze the balls off a brass monkey". According to a popular folk etymology, this phrase derives from cannonballs stowed on a brass triangle named after a "powder monkey" (a boy who runs gunpowder to the ship's guns) spilling owing to the frame's contraction in cold weather. (This is however incorrect for several physical and linguistic reasons.) The phrase is a 20th-century variant of earlier expressions referring to other body parts, especially the nose and tail, indicating that the brass monkey took the form of a real monkey.
bruv
clipping of brother, used as a form of address for a man (US: bro, bruh)
burgle *
(originally colloquial, back-formation from burglar) to commit burglary (in the US, burglarize is overwhelmingly preferred, although burgle is occasionally found).
butty
(Northern England) a sandwich (esp. 'chip butty' or 'bacon butty').

== C ==
candy floss
spun sugar confection (US: cotton candy); "candyfloss culture" was also used around the late 1950s / early 1960s as a derisory term for the emerging American pop culture, similar to "McCulture" or "Coca-Cola culture" in more recent times
caster sugar
Finely granulated white or pale golden sugar. (US: superfine sugar)
Chesterfield sofa
a deep buttoned sofa, with arms and back of the same height. It is usually made from leather and the term Chesterfield in British English is only applied to this type of sofa.
child-minder
(babysitter) a person who looks after babies and young children (usually in the person's own home) while the parents are working. Child-minders are a more professional type of babysitter, and in England are required to be registered with Ofsted, the government-sanctioned education regulation body. They must also have at least a Level 2 qualification in childcare. A babysitter does not require these qualifications. Babysitter is more common in the UK.
chunter
(sometimes chunner) to mutter, to grumble, to talk continuously; "What's he chuntering on about?"
climbing frame
a playground apparatus composed of bars for children to climb on (jungle gym in U.S.)
common or garden
of the usual or ordinary type.
community payback
court-mandated sentence of community service either in addition to or as a substitute for incarceration
compère
(French) master of ceremonies, MC
cornflour
Finely ground flour made from corn, used as a thickener in cooking (US: corn starch)
counterpane
a decorative cloth used to cover a bed when it is not in use (US: bedspread)
current account
personal bank account used for everyday transactions (US: checking account)

== D ==
defeating the ends of justice
Scotland only; England and Wales equivalent is perverting the course of justice (similar concept in US: obstruction of justice)
dodgems *
funfair or fairground bumper cars
dogsbody
someone who carries out menial tasks on another's behalf; a drudge
dog's breakfast/dinner
something poorly executed; a mess
donkey's years
a very long time. (originally "donkey's ears" as rhyming slang).
doolally
(informal), mentally ill. From the former British Army Deolali transit camp in India

== E ==
exclamation mark *
(US: exclamation point)

== F ==
faff
to dither, futz, waste time, be ineffectual, "I spent the day faffing about in my room". Also related noun ("That's too much of a faff").
fan-assisted oven
an oven that has fans to circulate air around food (US and UK: convection oven)
fizzy drink *
carbonated soft drink (US: soda, pop, coke, tonic (New England) depending on the region)
flypast
ceremonial flight of aircraft (US: flyby)
French letter
(slang) condom

== G ==
gaol
A prison, mostly historical (US and most modern UK usage: jail)
gear-lever / gearstick
handle for changing gears in a vehicle or other machinery (US gearshift)
get off with someone *
(colloquial) to begin a sexual relationship
gobby
loudmouthed and offensive
gods (the)
(informal) the highest level of seating in a theatre or auditorium, usually the "Upper Circle", as in "we have a seat up in the gods" (US: nosebleed section)
golden syrup
Syrup of a golden-yellow colour.
gritter
a truck that spreads sand or salt on roads when they are covered with ice (US: salt truck, salt spreader)
grotty
disgusting, dirty, poor quality (originally from grotesque, though now rarely used with quite that meaning). In a scene from the 1964 film A Hard Day's Night, George Harrison has to explain the meaning and origin of the word; the impression is given that it was then considered modern slang, known only to trendy youngsters (this is no longer the case). George Harrison would have been familiar with the word as well-established Liverpool slang.

== H ==
hire purchase
a credit system by which purchased articles are paid for in installments (US: installment plan or layaway if the item is kept at the store until the final payment is made)
hoarding
a panel used to display outdoor advertisements, such as on the sides of buildings, or alongside highways (US billboard)
holidaymaker
person on holiday [DM] (US: vacationer)
hot up
to become more exciting (US: heating up).

== J ==
jiggery-pokery
Trickery or dishonest behaviour.
Joey
Term of abuse used of someone perceived to be foolish, stupid, incompetent, clumsy, uncoordinated, ridiculous, idiotic. Originated with the appearances of cerebral palsy sufferer Joey Deacon on children's TV programme Blue Peter; still a popular insult among adults who saw the programmes as children.

== K ==
kerfuffle *
a disorderly outburst, disturbance or tumult; from Scots carfuffle
kazi
(slang) lavatory (numerous alternative spellings are seen, such as khazi, karzy, karsey, carzey etc.)
knackered
(slang) exhausted, broken; the term may derive from either of two meanings of the noun knacker (see knacker's yard and knackers below), thus to slaughter or castrate

== L ==
lag (usually "old lag")
an inmate in a prison
landslip
A collapse of a mass of earth or rock from a mountain or cliff (US: landslide)
liquidiser
blender

== M ==
mentioned in dispatches
a commendation through being identified positively in a military report
minge
(vulgar) (rhymes with singe) female genitals or pubic hair
minger
(from the Scots ming "to smell strongly and unpleasantly"; rhymes with "singer") someone who is unattractive (i.e. minging, see below).
mobile phone
(US: cell phone)
mong
(offensive) stupid person or one with learning difficulties; from Mongol in its sense as an obsolete term for someone with Down syndrome
muppet
an incompetent or foolish person

== N ==
nancy boy
an effeminate man, a homosexual (dated)
nonce
a slang term for a sex offender, especially one convicted of sexual offences against children. The supposed origin from the term "Not on normal courtyard exercise" is probably a backronym.
nought
the number zero, chiefly British spelling of naught
numpty
(originally Scottish, now more widespread) a stupid person

== O ==
on the back foot
outclassed; outmanoeuvred by a competitor or opponent
on the trot
(idiom, informal) adverbial referring to actions done directly after each other in sequence or, alternately, with no pause (alternately synonymous with in a row or continuously in U.S.); also used adjectivally to mean always busy
oughtn't
A contraction of "ought not" (US "shouldn't, ought not")

== P ==
Paki shop
a newsagent or general corner shop run by a person of Pakistani or other South Asian origin. No longer considered an acceptable term; edited out of repeat showings of an episode of Only Fools and Horses. Not to be confused with "packie", used in some areas of the US such as New England, short for "package store", meaning "liquor store". As with some other terms (cf. fanny pack), this is a case where innocent US use of a term may be unintentionally offensive in the UK.
pelican crossing
pedestrian crossing with traffic lights operated by pedestrians (formed from Pedestrian Light-Controlled)
perverting the course of justice
England and Wales only (similar concept in US: obstruction of justice)
photofit
a portrait created from photograph samples of facial features, relying on the accounts of witnesses of a criminal suspect, for the purpose of appealing to the public in the attempt to identify the suspect (trademark) (no direct US equivalent but similar identikit and generic facial composite used in US and UK)
plain flour
Flour that does not contain a raising agent. (US: All-purpose flour)
plimsoll
a type of shoe with a canvas upper and rubber sole, formerly the typical gym shoe used in schools. Now superseded by "trainer". (US: sneaker or Tennis shoe)
plod
policeman (mildly derogatory) – from PC Plod in Enid Blyton's Noddy books.

== R ==
Red top
sensational tabloid newspaper
Release on Licence
a term for parole in England and Wales

== S ==
sandwich cake or sandwich
(US: layer cake)
shambolic
chaotic, disorganized
shan't
A contraction of shall not, considered archaic in American English (US and UK also: "won't"). Rarely used in Scotland.
shite
(vulgar) variant of shit
skirting board
a wooden board covering the lowest part of an interior wall (US: baseboard)
slapper
a promiscuous woman
snigger
silly or unkind laughter at someone or something (usually snicker in U.S.)
spend a penny
(informal, old-fashioned) urinate
square go
unarmed brawl
sticky wicket
(usually "batting on a sticky wicket") facing a difficult situation. From cricket: a sticky wicket is one that has a damp surface on top of a dry base, typically after rain. It causes the ball to bounce unpredictably and possibly dangerously for the batsman
strong flour
flour made from wheat varieties which are high in gluten. Used for making bread. (US: bread flour)
sun cream
sunscreen

== W ==
whilst
A more restricted form of "while" which cannot be used as a noun, verb, or preposition. In the US, "whilst" is old-fashioned and pretentious to the point where it is now only appropriate for creating a dated effect, as in historical fiction.
write-off *
when cost of repair of a damaged asset (usually a car) is not feasible or exceeds its insurance value (US:total loss, totalled; hull loss [for aircraft]) Is also used formally in the context of accounting, including in the US, to mean a permissible deduction applied to offset certain kinds of costs ("a tax write-off").

== See also ==
- List of words having different meanings in British and American English: A–L
- List of words having different meanings in British and American English: M–Z
- List of American words not widely used in the United Kingdom
- Cockney rhyming slang

== Bibliography ==
- Hargraves, Orin (2002). Mighty Fine Words and Smashing Expressions: Making Sense of Transatlantic English. Oxford: Oxford University Press. ISBN 0-19-515704-4.
- Peters, Pam (2004). The Cambridge Guide to English Usage. Cambridge: Cambridge University Press. ISBN 0-521-62181-X.
