= Tranquil (disambiguation) =

Tranquil, is a calm state of mind.

Tranquil' may also refer to:

- Tranquil (horse) (1920–1938), a British Thoroughbred racehorse
- Tranquil, Mississippi, a town in the United States
- Tranquil Lake, a lake in the South Orkney Islands

== See also ==
- Tranquil Star, an Australian Thoroughbred racehorse
- Tranquility (disambiguation)
