= Breadbox =

Bread storage device

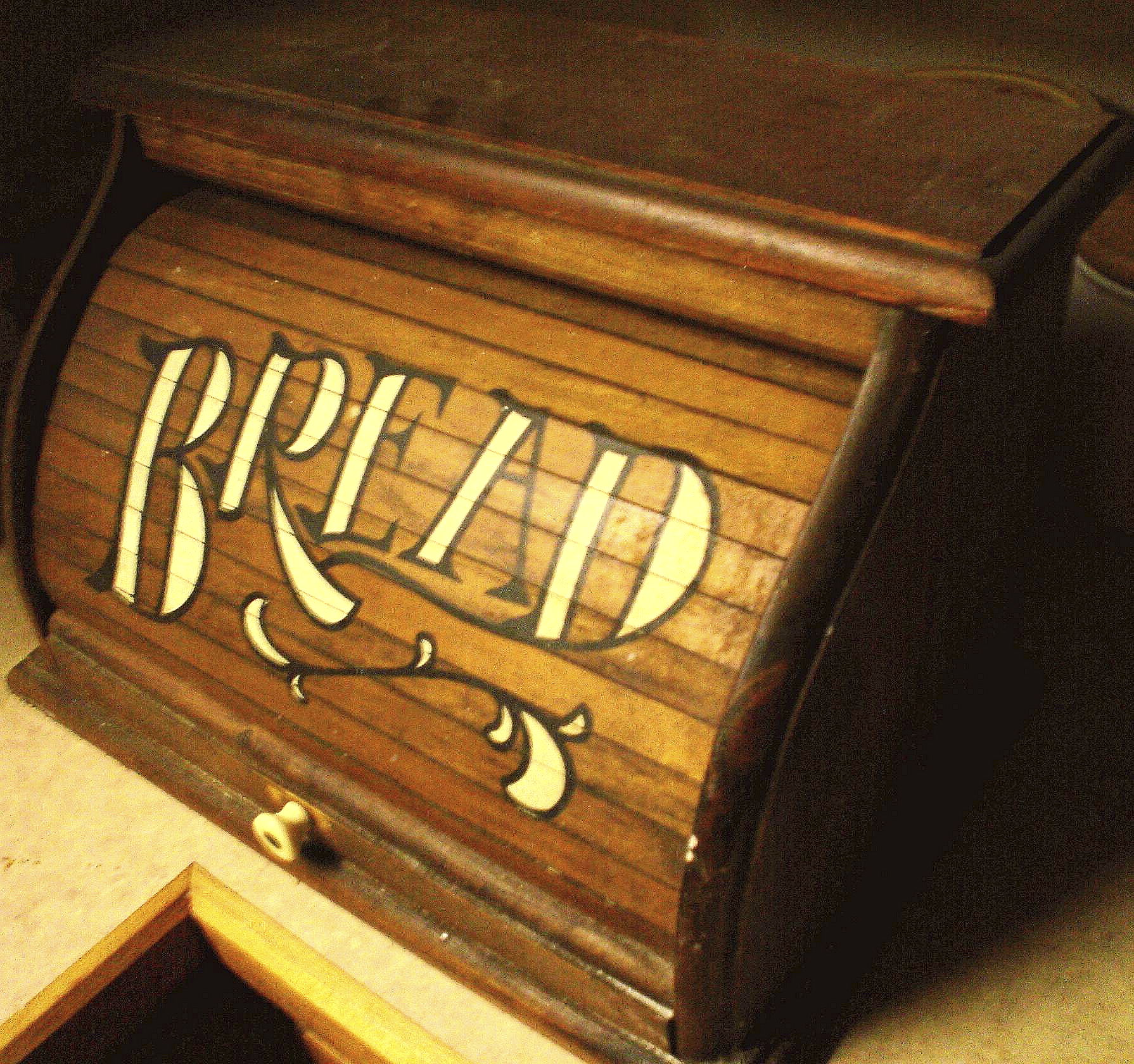
A typical wooden breadbox.

A breadbox (chiefly American) or a breadbin (chiefly British) is a container for storing bread and other baked goods to keep them fresh. They were a more common household kitchen item until bread started being made commercially with food preservatives and wrapped in plastic. Breadboxes are still used by many people to store commercially purchased bread, but are used more especially by people who bake bread at home. They are usually made of metal, wood or sometimes pottery (pottery breadboxes are also called bread crocks). Old breadboxes can be collectible antiques.

Breadboxes are most commonly big enough to fit one or two average size loaves of bread—up to about 16 inches wide by 8 to 9 inches high and deep (40 cm × 20 cm × 20 cm).

== Working theory ==
Stale bread is colloquially called "dry", but drying and staling are distinct processes. Stale bread can weigh the same as "fresh" bread, indicating almost no loss of water; conversely, bread can be dried out without going stale. Staling is a process of retrogradation, in which the starch transposes to a crystalline form in the presence of the water contained within the bread itself. The process speeds up at cooler temperatures, such as under refrigeration, and thus bread stored at room temperature remains fresher for longer periods than refrigerated bread. Frozen bread, however, traps the moisture as ice, and prevents the staling process.

Breadboxes are thus designed to:

- keep their contents at room temperature, prolonging edible storage time;
- have a lid loose enough to allow airflow, reducing condensation, which helps to prevent the formation of mold;
- have a lid tight enough to slow the drying process as well as to protect the contents from mice and all other pests, including ants and flies.

== As a saying ==
The breadbox is commonly used to describe the size of other objects, a sense that has outlasted its routine use in the kitchen. The query "Is it bigger than a breadbox?" was popularized by Steve Allen on the American game show What's My Line?, where it became a running gag after he initially asked the question in 1953. It remains a popular question in the parlor game 20 Questions.
