= Subaltern =

Subaltern may refer to:

- Subaltern (military), a primarily British and Commonwealth military term for a junior officer
- Subaltern (postcolonialism), colonial populations who are outside the hierarchy of power
- Subalternation, going from a universal proposition to a particular proposition in logic
- "A Subaltern", the author listed in William Cobbett's "The Soldier's Friend"

== See also ==
- Subaltern Studies Group
