= The Sea of Tranquility =

Studio album by Neograss
- Released: August 2, 2010
- Recorded: April 2010 in Tromsø, Norway: Kysten Studio
- Genre: Bluegrass, Progressive rock, Ambient
- Length: 29:35
- Label: TMA Music
- Producer: Emil Bekkevold & Tore Morten Andreassen

Neograss chronology
The Sea of Tranquility (2010)	Smokey Reeds the Bandit (2011)

Professional ratings
Review scores
Source	Rating
DPRP	7.5/10 stars
iTromsø	5/6 stars

The Sea of Tranquility is the debut album of the Norwegian band Neograss, released on August 2, 2010.

== Track listing ==
1. «The Sea of Tranquility» (Bekkevold/Andreassen) – 29:35

Introduction and Exposition

Part I : Lunar Landscapes
Part II : Tranquility
Part III : Underwater Abyss (Instr.)
Part IV : Voyage of the Damned (Instr.)
Part V : The resurrection (Reprise)

Development

Part VI : Silencio
Part VII : Higher Ground (Instr.)

Recapitulation and Coda

Part VIII : Impact (Instr.)
Part IX : Voyage of the Illuminator (Instr. Reprise)
Part X : Terminus (Coda)

== Personnel ==
Neograss

- Emil Bekkevold – vocals, banjo
- Tore Morten Andreassen – Acoustic guitars, mellotron
- Åsmund Wilter Kildal Eriksson - Doublebass
- Aleksander Kostopoulos – Drums

Technical

- Production – Emil Bekkevold, Tore Morten Andreassen
- Mixing – Jon Marius Aareskjold
- Engineering – Håkon Elias Pettersen
