= List of English-language idioms of the 19th century =

19th century English language idioms

This is a list of idioms that were recognizable to literate people in the late-19th century, and have become unfamiliar since.

As the article list of idioms in the English language notes, a list of idioms can be useful, since the meaning of an idiom cannot be deduced by knowing the meaning of its constituent words. See that article for a fuller discussion of what an idiom is, and what it is not. In addition, the often-obscure references or shared values that lie behind an idiom will themselves lose applicability over time, although the surviving literature of the period relies on their currency for full understanding.

== A ==
- Abbot of Misrule – Lord of Misrule
- admirable doctor – Roger Bacon
- Attic bee – Sophocles, from the sweetness and beauty of his productions

== B ==
- bidding prayer – an exhortation to prayer in some special reference, followed by the Lord's Prayer, in which the congregation joins
- blue-gown – a beggar, a bedesman of the Scottish king, who wore a blue gown, the gift of the king, and had his license to beg
- bonnet-piece – a gold coin of James V of Scotland, so called from the king being represented on it as wearing a bonnet instead of a crown
- Brown, Jones, and Robinson – three middle-class Englishmen on their travels abroad, as figured in the pages of Punch

== C ==
- chicard – French loanword; the harlequin of the French carnival, grotesquely dressed up
- Circumlocution Office – a name employed by Charles Dickens in his serial novel Little Dorrit (1855–1857) to designate wearisome government bureaucracy; it is mentioned in Anthony Trollope’s 1857 novel The Three Clerks
- comity of nations – the name given for the effect given in one country to the laws and institutions of another in dealing with a native of it; see extraterritoriality
- corn-cracker – the nickname of a Kentucky man; pejorative
- corpuscular philosophy – the philosophy which accounts for physical phenomena by the position and the motions of corpuscles
- Cincinnatus of the Americans – George Washington, after the original Roman Cincinnatus
- Conscript Fathers – translates from the Latin Patres Conscripti, a term for members of the Roman Senate

== D ==
- diamond necklace – specifically, the one belonging to Marie Antoinette
- Dircaean swan or Dircæan swan – Pindar, so called from the fountain Dirce, near Thebes, his birthplace

== F ==
- Faggot vote – a vote created by the partitioning of a property into as many apartments as will entitle the holders to vote
- First Gentleman of Europe – George IV of the United Kingdom, from his fine style and manners
- Federal Union – generally any union of states in which each state has jurisdiction in local matters, such as the United States

== G ==
- Gehenna bailiffs – ministers of hell's justice, whose function is to see to and enforce the rights of hell
- Gens Braccata – the Gauls, from braccæ or breeches
- Gens Palliata – the Greeks, from wearing the pallium (square woollen cloak)
- Gens Togata – the Romans, from wearing the toga
- German Voltaire – name given sometimes to Christoph Martin Wieland and sometimes to Johann Wolfgang von Goethe
- Gothamite – a native of New York City; still in use in some contexts

== H ==
- hectic fever – a fever connected with tuberculosis, and showing itself by a bright-pink flush on the cheeks
- horn gate – the gate of dreams which come true, as distinct from the ivory gate, through which the visions seen are shadowy and unreal

== I ==
- in-and-in – breeding of animals from the same parentage; also an old two-dice game, where "in" is a double and "in-and-in" is double doubles, which sweeps the board
- Island of Saints – a poetic name given to Ireland in the Middle Ages
- Ivan Ivanovitch – a term invoking a lazy, good-natured Russian, akin to John Bull the Englishman or Brother Jonathan the American

== J ==
- Jack Brag – a pretender who ingratiates himself with people above him
- Jackaroo

== O ==
- The Open Secret – the secret that lies open to all, but is seen into and understood by only few, applied especially to the mystery of the life, the spiritual life, which is the possession of all (Thomas Carlyle)

== P ==
- passing-bell – a bell tolled at the moment of the death of a person to invite his neighbours to pray for the safe passing of his soul; see death knell
- penny wedding – a wedding at which the guests pay part of the charges of the festival
- persiflage – a light, quizzing mockery, or scoffing, especially on serious subjects, out of a cool, callous contempt for them
- Peter Bell – a simple rustic (William Wordsworth).
- petite nature – a French loanword applied to pictures containing figures less than life-size, but with the effect of life-size
- pot-wallopers – a class of electors in a borough who claimed the right to vote on the ground of boiling a pot within its limits for six months
- pourparler – a diplomatic conference towards the framing of a treaty
- Punic faith – a promise that one can put no trust in. From Latin punica fides, alluding to Roman mistrust of Carthage

== R ==
- revival of letters – a term for literary aspects of the Renaissance, specifically the revival of the study of Greek literature

== T ==
- The Temple of Immensity – the universe as felt to be in every corner of it a temple consecrated to worship in
- Tom and Jerry – a pair of young men about town from the play Tom and Jerry, or Life in London (1821), by William Thomas Moncrieff, which was very successful in England and the United States in the 1820s, based on the newspaper column by Pierce Egan

== See also ==
- Victorian literature
- Lists of English words
