= List of English auxiliary verbs =

This is a list of English auxiliary verbs, i.e. helping verbs, which include Modal verbs and Semi-modal verbs. See also auxiliary verbs, light verbs, and catenative verbs.

== Primary Auxiliary Verbs ==
- be
- do
- have

== Single Word Modal Auxiliary Verbs ==
- best
- better
- can
- could
- dare
- may
- might
- must
- need
- ought
- shall
- should
- will
- would

== Two Word Semi-Modal Auxiliary Verb Phrases ==
- be to
- dare to
- got to (gotta)
- have to
- had best
- had better
- need to
- ought to (oughta)
- would rather
- used to

== Three Word Semi-Modal Auxiliary Verb Phrases ==
- be able to
- be about to
- be allowed to
- be bound to
- be forced to
- be free to
- be going to (be gonna)
- be likely to
- be obliged to
- be required to
- be supposed to
- be unlikely to
- be used to
- get used to
- have got to
