= Pectoral muscles (disambiguation) =

Pectoral muscles are the muscles of the human chest connecting to the upper arm.

Pectoral muscles may also refer to:

- Pectoral muscles (cat), various muscles of the domestic cat
- Muscles in the thorax or chest of any animal species
- Muscles on the sides of fish; see Pectoral fin

== See also ==
- Pectoral (disambiguation)
