= Back-formation =

Creating a word by removing actual or supposed affixes

Back-formation is the process or result of creating a new word via morphology, typically by removing or substituting actual or supposed affixes from a lexical item, in a way that expands the number of lexemes associated with the corresponding root word. James Murray coined the term back-formation in 1889. (Oxford English Dictionary Online preserves its first use of 'back-formation' from 1889 in the definition of to burgle; from burglar.)

For example, the noun resurrection was borrowed from Latin, and the verb resurrect was then back-formed hundreds of years later from it by removing the -ion suffix. This segmentation of resurrection into resurrect + ion was possible because English had examples of Latin words in the form of verb and verb+-ion pairs, such as opine/opinion. These became the pattern for many more such pairs, where a verb derived from a Latin supine stem and a noun ending in ion entered the language together, such as insert/insertion, project/projection, etc.

== Similar phenomena ==
Back-formation may be similar to the reanalyses or folk etymologies when it rests on an erroneous understanding of the morphology of the longer word. For example, the singular noun asset is a back-formation from the plural assets. However, assets was not originally a plural; it is a loanword from Anglo-Norman asetz (modern French assez). The -s was reanalyzed as a plural suffix.

Back-formation varies from clipping – back-formation may change the word's class or meaning, whereas clipping creates shortened words from longer words but does not change the class or meaning of the word.

Words can sometimes acquire new lexical categories without any derivational change in form (for example, ship (in the nautical sense) was first a noun and later was used as a verb). That process is called conversion or zero-derivation. Like back-formation, it can produce a new noun or a new verb, but it involves no back-forming.

== In English ==
Back-formation may be particularly common in English given that many English words are borrowed from Latin, French and Greek, which together provide English a large range of common affixes. Many words with affixes have entered English, such as dismantle and dishevelled, so it may be easy to believe that these are formed from roots such as mantle (assumed to mean "to put something together") and shevelled (assumed to mean "well-dressed"), although these words with those meanings have no history of existing in English.

Many words came into English by this route: pease was once a mass noun (as in "pease pudding"), but was reinterpreted as a plural, leading to the back-formation pea. The noun statistic was likewise a back-formation from the field of study statistics. In Britain, the verb burgle came into use in the nineteenth century as a back-formation from burglar (which can be compared to the North American verb burglarize formed by suffixation).

Other examples are

- Singular "sastruga", plural "sastrugi" (from Russian): new Latin-type singular "sastrugus" has been used sometimes
- Singular "syringe", from plural "syringes"; the original Greek singular is syrinx. Similar in nature is "phalange", from plural "phalanges"; the original singular being phalanx..
- Singular tamale, from the plural tamales; the original Spanish singular is tamal.
- Verbs "edit" from editor, "babysit" from babysitter, and "spelunk" from spelunker
- Verb "donate" from donation
- Verbs "euthanase" or "euthanize" from the noun euthanasia.
- Verb "prepone" from the verb "postpone" to mean "to advance." While used predominantly in Indian English, the earliest known use is from the works of John Irland, and predates the use of English in India.

The verb translate is a back-formation from translation, which is from Latin trāns + lāt- + -tio. Lāt- is from the very irregular (suppletive) verb ferō 'to carry.' Trānslāt- in Latin was merely a semi-adjectival form of trānsferō meaning '[something] having been carried across [into a new language]' (cf. transfer). The result of the action trānsferō textum 'to translate a text' was a textus trānslātus 'a text that has been translated.' Thus the verb in English is really from a (semi-)adjectival form in Latin.

Even though many English words are formed this way, new coinages may sound strange, and are often used for humorous effect. For example, gruntled (from disgruntled) is used only in humorous contexts, as when P. G. Wodehouse wrote, "I could see that, if not actually disgruntled, he was far from being gruntled", or the character Turk in the American sitcom Scrubs told another character, "I don't disdain you! It's quite the opposite – I dain you." As it happens, gruntle and dain are both attested much earlier, but not as antonyms of the longer forms.

Back-formations frequently begin in colloquial use and only gradually become accepted. For example, enthuse (from enthusiasm) is gaining popularity, though today it is still generally considered nonstandard.

The Latin preposition versus, meaning against, has frequently been mistaken by children and teenagers as the present tense of a verb "to verse." A reference to a school sports competition "the Sharks versus the Jets" might be interpreted as "the Sharks are versing the Jets." While this use of the verb has been reported in North America and Australia since the early 1980s, very few dictionaries have accepted it as standard.

The immense celebrations in Britain at the news of the relief of the Siege of Mafeking briefly created the verb to maffick, meaning to celebrate both extravagantly and publicly. "Maffick" is a back-formation from Mafeking, a place-name that was treated humorously as a gerund or participle. There are many other examples of back-formations in the English language.

A butler is often described as "one who buttles," a verb which remains non-standard.

=== River names ===
Back-formations are frequent amongst river names in England for a number of reasons. Place names of Brittonic origin are especially susceptible to folk etymology and back-formations due to language and knowledge of the place names dying out with the arrival and settlement of Anglo-Saxon tribes. Frequently river names are derived from nearby settlements with the suffix -ford. Typically because it is assumed that the first half of the name is in reference to the river or stream. Below are some examples of these -ford back-formations.

River Alre

The river Alre in Hampshire was named due to a false assumption that the nearby village Alresford was named after the river which it was located near. In reality its name comes from the Old English alor.

River Chelmer

The River Chelmer in Essex is named after the town of Chelmsford (Chelmeresford) which is derived from the Saxon personal name Cēolmǣr.

== In other languages ==
=== Israeli Hebrew ===
Back-formation in Israeli Hebrew often violates the prescriptive rules of the Academy of the Hebrew Language. For example:

1. משאבּ masháb "resource" (prescriptive form: משאב mash'áv) is a back-formation from the plural form משאבּים mashabím.
2. עקרבּ akráb "scorpion" (prescriptive form: עקרב ‘aqráv) is a back-formation from the plural form עקרבּים akrabím.

== See also ==
- List of English back-formations
- Folk etymology
- Backronym
- Retronym
- Rebracketing or juncture loss
- Onomasiology
- Unpaired word
