= JoJo's Bizarre Adventure: Eyes of Heaven =

2015 video game

- Japanese cover, depicting the manga's protagonists
- Developer: CyberConnect2
- Publisher: Bandai Namco Entertainment
- Director: Kenei Nakasha
- Producers: Noriaki Niino; Hiroshi Matsuyama
- Artist: Soichiro Iwasaki
- Composer: Chikayo Fukuda
- Series: JoJo's Bizarre Adventure
- Platforms: PlayStation 3 (JPN); PlayStation 4 (WW)
- Release: JP: December 17, 2015; NA: June 28, 2016; EU: July 1, 2016
- Genre: Fighting
- Modes: Single-player, multiplayer

JoJo's Bizarre Adventure: Eyes of Heaven (Note: ジョジョの奇妙な冒険 アイズオブヘブン (Japanese: JoJo no Kimyō na Bōken Aizu Obu Hebun)) is an action video game for the PlayStation 3 and PlayStation 4 developed by CyberConnect2 and published by Bandai Namco Entertainment. Based on the JoJo's Bizarre Adventure manga series by Hirohiko Araki, Eyes of Heaven is the second game in the franchise to be developed by CyberConnect2, following 2013's JoJo's Bizarre Adventure: All Star Battle, with which this game shares the same engine. The game was released for the PlayStation 3 and PlayStation 4 in Japan on December 17, 2015, and was released exclusively on the PlayStation 4 in Western territories on June 28, 2016.

== Plot ==
The game's main storyline takes place immediately following the events of Stardust Crusaders. Jotaro Kujo and his allies, having just defeated the evil vampire Dio Brando, are suddenly attacked by friends and enemies who have either disappeared or died along the way. They are soon approached by a young Robert E. O. Speedwagon, who possesses a piece of the Saint's Corpse that allows him to not only travel through time and space, but also dispel the evil influence possessing the mysterious foes. Speedwagon leads Jotaro and his allies on a journey through space, time, and alternate universes, in order to stop another iteration of Dio and his disciple Enrico Pucci from obtaining the Saint's Corpse and purging the world of the Joestar family. In their quest to collect the Saint's Corpse, Jotaro and Joseph are joined by characters from each part of JoJo's Bizarre Adventure, including Jotaro's great-great-grandfather Jonathan Joestar, a younger version of Joseph Joestar, Joseph's and Dio's illegitimate sons Josuke Higashikata and Giorno Giovanna, Jotaro's own daughter Jolyne Cujoh, paraplegic jockey Johnny Joestar, and an amnesiac given the temporary name of Josuke Higashikata.

The heroes collect every part of the Corpse save one. Suddenly, the Joestars encounter an alternate Dio Brando, now wielding an upgraded version of his Stand that can rewrite reality itself, which he calls The World Over Heaven. Though Dio takes most of their collected parts of the Corpse, the group narrowly escapes Dio's grasp, with Jotaro retaining a piece of the Corpse. Funny Valentine appears to the group and reveals that the version of Dio they encountered, now known as DIO, Gone to Heaven, is from an alternate world where he was victorious over Jotaro and succeeded in his becoming a god. He learned of the base world upon encountering Valentine and nullifying the infinite rotation Johnny had placed upon him and now plans on using the Saint's Corpse to take over all of reality and erase the Joestars from existence. Valentine further reveals that this version of Dio still bears the same type of Stand as Jotaro's, and remains unaware that objects from parallel dimensions are drawn to each other and destroyed upon contact. As the Joestars continue battling Dio's minions to regain their stolen Corpse parts, Valentine is eliminated by Dio as retribution for his betrayal.

Eventually, the Joestar group returns to Egypt to confront Dio, who defeats and absorbs most of the group's souls along with the completed Saint's Corpse. Despite a final stand by Jotaro and Jolyne, the former having discovered his own Stand's upgraded ability, Dio eliminates Jolyne and attempts to do the same to Jotaro. However, Jotaro uses Dio's armlets from his own universe to destroy Dio's hands, the source of his Stand's ability to rewrite reality, before ultimately pummeling Dio and completely destroying his body. After Dio's defeat, Jotaro uses Star Platinum's new powers to restore the original timeline and prevent the deaths of the Joestar family's allies. Returning to the same point where he left, Jotaro parts ways with his friends as he and Joseph board a flight to Japan.

Eleven years later, Jotaro arrives in Morioh with a six-year-old Jolyne, hoping to be a better father to her in this timeline. (Note: Meaning the events of Stone Ocean will never occur.) As Jolyne runs off to play with a turtle, Jotaro approaches a youth named Koichi Hirose and asks him about a high schooler named Josuke Higashikata, setting the events of an alternate Diamond Is Unbreakable in motion.

== Gameplay ==
Eyes of Heaven is designed to be a 3D action brawler with tag-team elements set in large arenas based on locations in the JoJo's Bizarre Adventure manga. Players may pick a single character to control in a large environment, as well as a second character that may be controlled by either a CPU or second human player to fight the enemy team for a 2v2 battle. Certain match-ups contain special animations and dialogue between two characters, mostly between allies in the form of unique combination attacks such as the Dual Combos (デュアルコンボ, Dyuaru Konbo) and Dual Heat Attacks (デュアルヒートアタック, Dyuaru Hīto Attaku), though provide no discernible bonuses or advantages in battle. The playstyle is similar to that of other known CyberConnect2's Shonen Jump game series, Naruto: Ultimate Ninja series, such as the combo mechanisms and the air to air combos. The game allows for online play through the PlayStation Network system.

=== Battle Styles ===
Like in All Star Battle characters are categorized by Battle Styles which change how each character plays in the game, as well as their different strengths and weaknesses. For example, Vampires and the Mode-using Pillar Men heal from damage over time, except from Ripple-enhanced attacks; They can also be immobilized by ultraviolet lamps as part of Rudol von Stroheim's "The Prime Example of Superior German Science" style. The Battle Styles "Hamon User", "Vampire", "Mode", "Stand User", and "Mounted" return from All Star Battle (with slightly different names), while Eyes of Heaven adds "Ogre Street" (食屍鬼街（オウガーストリート）, Ōgā Sutorīto) and "The Prime Example of Superior German Science" (ゲルマン民族の最高知能の結晶, Geruman Minzoku no Saikō Chinō no Kesshō; literally "The Greatest Crystallized Intelligence of the German People") to the game, exclusive to Robert E. O. Speedwagon and Rudol von Stroheim respectively. Also new in Eyes of Heaven is that characters that were previously classified in All Star Battle as having one Battle Style but displayed abilities of another are now classified as having two Battle Styles. For example, Old Joseph Joestar is now classed as both a Ripple User and a Stand User, while in the previous game he was only classified as a Stand User who happened to have Ripple attacks as well.

== Characters ==
Jojo's Bizarre Adventure: Eyes of Heaven features the return of all playable characters from CyberConnect2's previous series entry, All Star Battle, with the exception of guest character Ikuro Hashizawa. The game also adds 13 new playable characters for a total of 53.

Part 1 Phantom Blood

- Jonathan Joestar (voice: Kazuyuki Okitsu), Hamon User
- Will A. Zeppeli (voice: Yoku Shioya), Hamon User
- Robert E. O. Speedwagon (voice: Yoji Ueda), Ogre Street (Note: New playable character since All Star Battle)
- Dio Brando (voice: Takehito Koyasu), Vampire

Part 2 Battle Tendency

- Joseph Joestar (voice: Tomokazu Sugita), Hamon User
- Caesar Anthonio Zeppeli (voice: Takuya Satō), Hamon User
- Rudol von Stroheim (voice: Atsushi Imaruoka), The Prime Example of Superior German Science
- Wamuu (voice: Akio Ōtsuka), Wind Mode
- Esidisi (voice: Keiji Fujiwara), Heat Control Mode
- Kars (voice: Kazuhiko Inoue), Light Mode
- Lisa Lisa (voice: Atsuko Tanaka), Hamon User (Note: Formerly downloadable content in All Star Battle)

Part 3 Stardust Crusaders

- Jotaro Kujo (voice: Daisuke Ono), Stand User; Stand Name: Star Platinum
- Noriaki Kakyoin (voice: Daisuke Hirakawa), Stand User; Stand Name: Hierophant Green
- Old Joseph Joestar(voice: Unsho Ishizuka) Hamon User and Stand User; Stand Name: Hermit Purple
- Jean Pierre Polnareff (voice: Fuminori Komatsu), Stand User; Stand Name: Silver Chariot
- Muhammad Avdol (voice: Kenta Miyake), Stand User; Stand Name: Magician's Red
- Iggy (voice: Misato Fukuen), Stand User; Stand Name: The Fool
- Hol Horse (voice: Hidenobu Kiuchi), Stand User; Stand Name: Emperor
- N'Doul (voice: Kentarō Itō), Stand User; Stand Name: Geb
- Mariah (voice: Ayahi Takagaki), Stand User; Stand Name: Bastet
- Pet Shop Stand User; Stand Name: Horus
- Vanilla Ice (voice: Shō Hayami), Vampire and Stand User; Stand Name: Cream
- DIO (voice: Takehito Koyasu), Vampire and Stand User; Stand Name: The World

Part 4 Diamond Is Unbreakable

- Josuke Higashikata (voice: Wataru Hatano), Stand User; Stand Name: Crazy Diamond
- Koichi Hirose (voice: Romi Park), Stand User; Stand Name: Echoes Act 1, 2, and 3
- Yukako Yamagishi, (voice: Chinatsu Akasaki), Stand User; Stand Name: Love Deluxe
- Okuyasu Nijimura (voice: Wataru Takagi), Stand User; Stand Name: The Hand
- Rohan Kishibe (voice: Hiroshi Kamiya), Stand User; Stand Name: Heaven's Door
- Shigekiyo Yangu, (voice: Kappei Yamaguchi), Stand User; Stand Name: Harvest
- Akira Otoishi (voice: Showtaro Morikubo), Stand User; Stand Name: Red Hot Chili Pepper
- Kosaku Kawajiri (voice: Rikiya Koyama), Stand User; Stand Name: Killer Queen (with Bomb No. 3 Bites the Dust and Stray Cat)
- Yoshikage Kira (voice: Rikiya Koyama), Stand User; Stand Name: Killer Queen (with Bomb No. 2 Sheer Heart Attack)
- Jotaro Kujo (Part 4) (第4部 空条承太郎, Dai-Yon-Bu Kūjō Jōtarō; voice: Daisuke Ono), Stand User; Stand Name: Star Platinum The World (Note: Available as DLC with a serial code included in first print copies of Eyes of Heaven.)

Part 5 Golden Wind

- Giorno Giovanna (voice: Daisuke Namikawa), Stand User; Stand Name: Gold Experience and Gold Experience Requiem
- Guido Mista (voice: Kenji Akabane), Stand User; Stand Name: Sex Pistols
- Pannacotta Fugo (voice: Hisafumi Oda), Stand User; Stand Name: Purple Haze
- Narancia Ghirga (voice: Yuuko Sanpei), Stand User; Stand Name: Aerosmith
- Bruno Bucciarati (voice: Noriaki Sugiyama), Stand User; Stand Name: Sticky Fingers
- Trish Una (voice: Nao Toyama), Stand User; Stand Name: Spice Girl
- Diavolo (voice: Toshiyuki Morikawa), Stand User; Stand Name: King Crimson
  - Vinegar Doppio (voice: Akira Ishida)

Part 6 Stone Ocean

- Jolyne Cujoh (voice: Miyuki Sawashiro), Stand User; Stand Name: Stone Free
- Ermes Costello (voice: Chizu Yonemoto), Stand User; Stand Name: Kiss
- Weather Report (voice: Tōru Ōkawa), Stand User; Stand Name: Weather Report
- Enrico Pucci (voice: Jouji Nakata), Stand User; Stand Name: Whitesnake,
- Narciso Anasui (voice: Yuichi Nakamura), Stand User; Stand Name: Diver Down
- Pucci, Awaiting the New Moon (新月の時を待つプッチ, Shingetsu no Toki o Matsu Putchi; voice: Jouji Nakata), Stand User; Stand Name: C-Moon and Made In Heaven

Part 7 Steel Ball Run

- Johnny Joestar (voice: Yūki Kaji), Mounted Fighter and Stand User; Stand Name: Tusk Acts 1, 2, 3 and 4
- Gyro Zeppeli (voice: Shinichiro Miki), Mounted Fighter, Spin User, and Stand User; Stand Name: Ball Breaker
- Diego Brando (voice: Takehito Koyasu), Mounted Fighter and Stand User; Stand Name: Scary Monsters
- Funny Valentine (voice: Yasuyuki Kase), Stand User; Stand Name: Dirty Deeds Done Dirt Cheap (D4C)
- Parallel World Diego (並行世界から来たディエゴ, Heikō Sekai kara Kita Diego; voice: Takehito Koyasu), Mounted and Stand User; Stand Name: THE WORLD

Part 8 JoJolion

- Josuke Higashikata (voice: Mitsuaki Madono), Stand User; Stand Name: Soft & Wet
- Joshu Higashikata (voice: Hiroaki Miura), Stand User; Stand Name: Nut King Call

Original non-playable character

- DIO, Gone to Heaven (天国に到達したDIO, Tengoku ni Tōtatsu-shita DIO; voice: Takehito Koyasu), Vampire and Stand User; Stand Name: The World Over Heaven (ザ・ワールド・オーバーヘブン, Za Wārudo Ōbā Hebun) (Note: Only appears in the game's Story Mode.)

== Development ==
The game was first announced in the 01, 15, 2015 issue of Famitsu and featured characters returning from JoJo's Bizarre Adventure: All Star Battle, such as Joseph Joestar, Jotaro Kujo, Noriaki Kakyoin, Caesar Zeppeli, and Josuke Higashikata (from Diamond Is Unbreakable), but also revealed the introduction of new characters Rudol von Stroheim and Diego Brando. Voice actors from All Star Battle as well as the JoJo's Bizarre Adventure: Stardust Crusaders anime adaptation reprise their roles in Eyes of Heaven. The game's genre is described as "Stylish Tag JoJo Action" (スタイリッシュタッグジョジョアクション, Sutairisshu Taggu JoJo Akushon), referring to its tag team style fighting. A demo of the game was revealed at the 2015 Jump Festa on December 20, 2014, and was made public on the Japanese PlayStation Store on January 29, 2015. On June 20, 2015, a second trailer for Eyes of Heaven was publicly revealed in downtown Shinjuku at the Studio Alta building. The trailer showcased all playable characters revealed so far from Phantom Blood to Diamond Is Unbreakable, as well as adventure and arena stages based on the locations featured in the manga.

The developer's official Twitter revealed on July 18, 2015, that the story mode for Eyes of Heaven would be personally handled by series creator Hirohiko Araki. In addition, it was also promised that the game would receive no paid downloadable content (DLC) or microtransactions beyond release, though they noted the possibility of preorder DLC. On August 21, 2015, a new key visual unveiled for the game revealed the remaining Parts, Stone Ocean and JoJolion alongside the playability of main protagonists Jolyne Cujoh, Johnny Joestar and Josuke Higashikata. On September 11, an issue of Jump magazine revealed the inclusion of the remaining Diamond is Unbreakable characters previously appearing in All-Star Battle, being Rohan Kishibe, Okuyasu Nijimura and Kosaku Kawajiri, as well as the game's upcoming playable appearance at the 2015 Tokyo Game Show. In addition, it was also announced that players who buy the first printing of the game would receive a limited-available code that allows them to play as Jotaro Kujo in his Part 4 incarnation (unavailable for use in either the game's Story Mode or in a Tag Team match paired with his Part 3 counterpart). Lastly, the game's release date of December 17, 2015, was revealed.

The third trailer of Eyes of Heaven was revealed on September 20, 2015, during a special JoJo conference, along with several gameplay demonstrations streamed live. The trailer is once again narrated by Rohan who meets with Tonio Trussardi at the "Cafe Deux Magots", and is later confronted by a shadowy figure once he discovers a fallen "Book of Heaven".

== Reception ==
Reception

Aggregate score
| Aggregator | Score |
|---|---|
| Metacritic | PS4: 61/100 (35 critics) |

Review scores
| Publication | Score |
|---|---|
| Computer Games Magazine | 5/10 |
| Destructoid | 4.5/10 |
| Famitsu | 34/40 |
| GameSpot | 6/10 |
| Push Square | 5/10 |

The game received a 34/40 by Famitsu magazine.
