= Jotaro Kujo =

Fictional character from JoJo's Bizarre Adventure

- JoJo's Bizarre Adventure character
- Jotaro (Right) and his Stand, Star Platinum (Left), as they appear in Stardust Crusaders
- First appearance: JoJo's Bizarre Adventure chapter 114 "Jotaro Kujo (1)" (April 3, 1989)
- Last appearance: JoJo's Bizarre Adventure chapter 748 "Made in Heaven, Part 6" (March 10, 2003)
- Created by: Hirohiko Araki
- Voiced by: Japanese: Kiyoyuki Yanada (drama CD, Heritage for the Future); Jūrōta Kosugi (OVA); Tetsu Inada (GioGio's Bizarre Adventure OST); Daisuke Ono (2013–present); Natsumi Takamori (anime, child); English: Abie Hadjitarkhani (OVA); Matthew Mercer (2014–present); Dorothy Elias-Fahn (anime, child)
- Portrayed by: Yusuke Iseya (JoJo's Bizarre Adventure: Diamond Is Unbreakable Chapter I)

In-universe information
- Full name: Jotaro Kujo
- Nickname: JoJo
- Occupation: High School Student (Stardust Crusaders) Marine Biologist (Diamond is Unbreakable) Oceanographer (Stone Ocean)
- Family: Sadao Kujo (father); Holly Kujo (mother)
- Spouse: Unnamed wife (divorced)
- Children: Jolyne Cujoh (daughter)
- Relatives: Joseph Joestar (grandfather); Suzi Q (grandmother); Jonathan Joestar (great-great-grandfather); Josuke Higashikata (half-uncle); Giorno Giovanna (half-great-granduncle)
- Nationality: Japanese
- Stand: Star Platinum; Star Platinum: The World
- Date of birth: 1971
- Date of death: March 22, 2012 (aged 41)
- Cause of death: Head split in two by Enrico Pucci's Made in Heaven

Jotaro "JoJo" Kujo (Japanese: 空条 承太郎, Hepburn: Kūjō Jōtarō) is a fictional character in the Japanese manga series JoJo's Bizarre Adventure, written and illustrated by Hirohiko Araki. The main protagonist of the series' third story arc, Stardust Crusaders, Jotaro is depicted as a rough delinquent with a noble heart who journeys from Japan to Egypt with his grandfather, Joseph Joestar, and their allies to defeat his great-great-grandfather's killer, Dio Brando, and save his mother's life. He has a Stand (a physical manifestation of his fighting spirit) named Star Platinum (星の白金(スタープラチナ), Sutā Purachina), whose power is incredible strength, speed, and precision. Later, Star Platinum gains the ability Star Platinum: The World (スタープラチナ ザ・ワールド, Sutā Purachina Za Wārudo), enabling Jotaro to stop time for a few seconds. Jotaro returns in subsequent story arcs of the manga as a supporting character. In Diamond Is Unbreakable, he meets his 16-year old biological uncle Josuke Higashikata. Jotaro also appears briefly in Golden Wind when he sends Koichi Hirose to Italy to spy on Dio's son, Giorno Giovanna, and in Stone Ocean to aid his daughter Jolyne Cujoh against the forces of Enrico Pucci. The siblings Yoshikage and Kei Kira take his place in the Joestar family tree in the alternate universe of JoJolion.

Araki wanted the protagonist of Stardust Crusaders to be Japanese when Phantom Blood was serializing and intended for Jotaro to be stoic to differentiate him from Jonathan and Joseph. The character was also inspired by American actor Clint Eastwood. In order to make the story more appealing, Araki created characters who would not overlap with Jotaro's characterization. Jotaro was voiced by Jūrōta Kosugi in the original video animation adaptation of Stardust Crusaders and by Abie Hadjitarkhani in its English dub. In the later television anime adaptation and in the rest of his occurrences in future parts, he was voiced by Daisuke Ono in Japanese and Matthew Mercer in English.

Critic and fan reception to Jotaro's character has been positive, with Araki himself stating that Jotaro has become so well known that he could act as a "synonym" for JoJo's Bizarre Adventure as a whole. Critics have praised his stoic personality and heroic actions, and although some reviewers noted Jotaro to be overpowered, others found his fights appealing and unique, such as the gambling battle with Daniel J. D'Arby.

== Creation and development ==
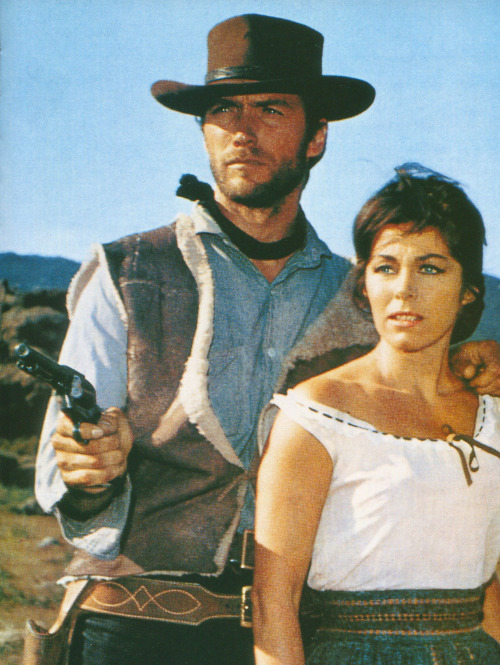
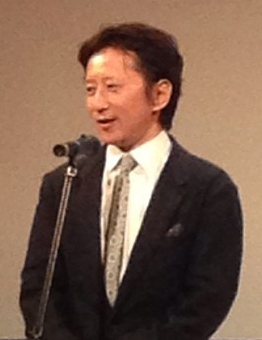
Clint Eastwood (left) was the primary inspiration for Jotaro, according to author Hirohiko Araki (right)

JoJo's Bizarre Adventure creator Hirohiko Araki decided to have a Japanese main character for Part 3 around the ending of the manga's first part. When Araki started working on Stardust Crusaders, his primary goal was to create characters with different personalities compared to those from Phantom Blood and Battle Tendency, the previous parts of JoJo's Bizarre Adventure; for instance, whereas Jonathan from Phantom Blood is a traditional portrayal of a man of justice, and Joseph from Battle Tendency is a "cheerful and flashy" character, Jotaro keeps his emotions hidden, with art of him depicting him as expressionless as possible. He was also designed to be taller and have more of a sense of weight to his body compared to Jonathan and Joseph, to make him seem fantastical, while his clothing—a school uniform—was meant to represent normalcy, as well as symbolize the part's story and setting. Araki modeled Jotaro after American actor Clint Eastwood, including his poses and catchphrases; Jotaro's signature finger-pointing pose came from one of Eastwood's poses with a .44 Magnum. His catchphrase "good grief" (やれやれだぜ, yare yare daze) was also an imitation of the type of lines Eastwood would say in his movies. Araki intended for Jotaro to be economical in his movements, and have "a presence that could be felt just by him standing". This is why the character might seem "rough" compared to other Weekly Shonen Jump protagonists; however, Jotaro fits Araki's own image of a hero perfectly as a "loner" who does not do the right thing for attention. The author said the character wearing his school uniform in the desert has its roots in Mitsuteru Yokoyama's Babel II. He also revealed that he has based the visual designs of subsequent JoJos on Jotaro's and then worked to differentiate them from there.

Other characters in Part 3 were written to contrast with Jotaro. Because Joseph was also the "JoJo" of his own story arc, Araki made sure to make it clear that Jotaro was the main character of Stardust Crusaders. Araki stated that he had Kakyoin act as a foil to Jotaro. Although they both wear school uniforms, Kakyoin's well-tailored one gives him the feel of an honor student, while Jotaro's loose-fitting uniform and accessories convey that he is a delinquent. He made Kakyoin Jotaro's first real Stand opponent to visually convey the concepts between short-range and long-range Stand abilities. In order to have him not overlap with Jotaro and Joseph, Polnareff was given a distinctive look and personality, which in turn made him stand out in the group.

=== Casting ===
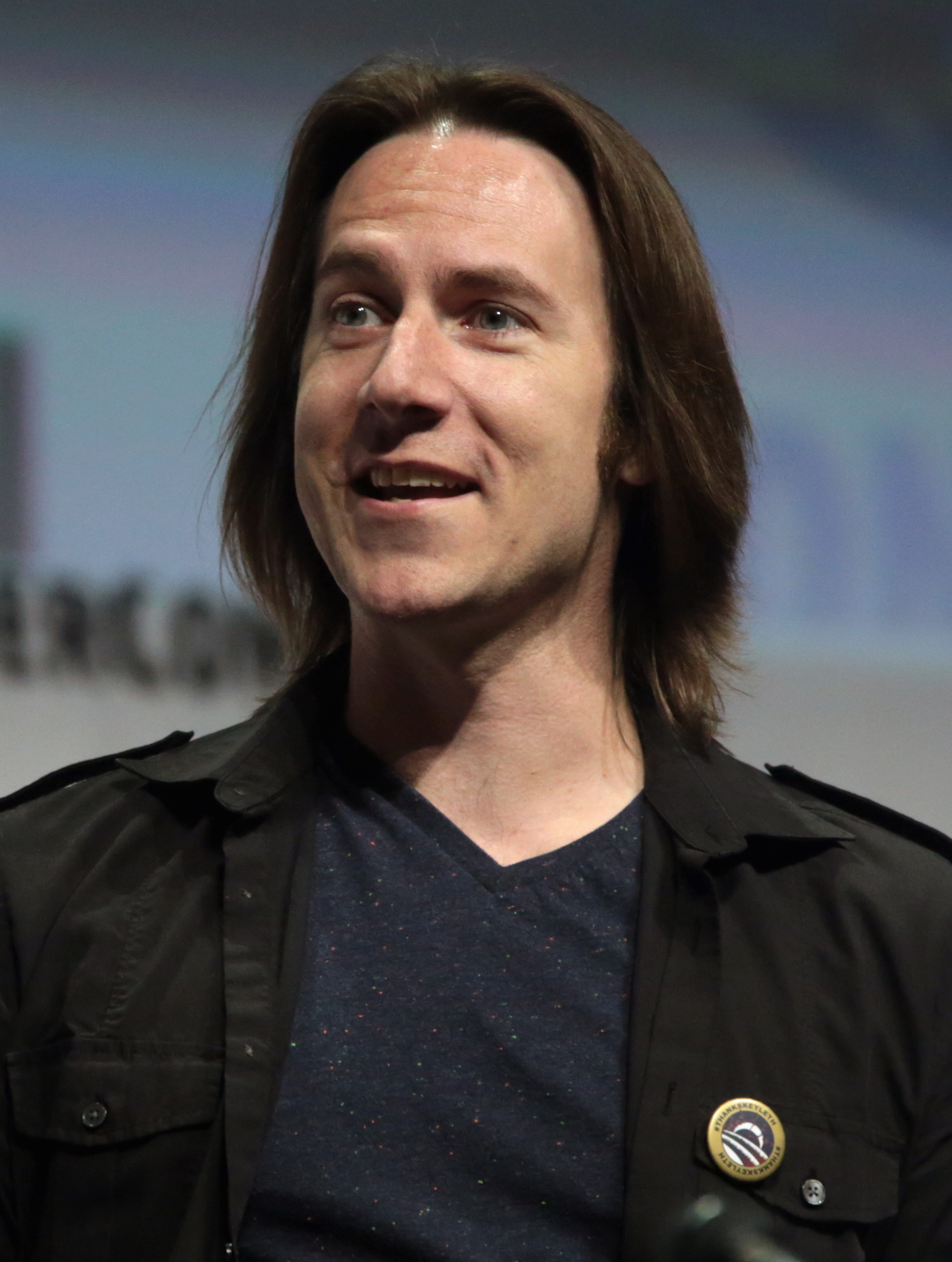
Matthew Mercer provides Jotaro Kujo's English voice in the TV anime.

In Japanese, Jotaro was voiced by Jūrōta Kosugi in the OVAs, but has been voiced by Daisuke Ono since JoJo's Bizarre Adventure: All Star Battle. Ono first learned of the series when he was studying in college during his free time and came to enjoy the manga. He felt pressure when doing Jotaro's voice, stating that "Jotaro's a representative character of the series." The audition process for the Stardust Crusaders television series was separate from that of the game he previously worked on. Ono had to re-audition for Jotaro's character. He further said "Jotaro is a character who's cool and collected and on the verge of boiling over all at the same time. He takes those two contradictory elements and makes them work together at a high level."

In English, Jotaro was voiced by Abie Hadjitarkhani in the OVAs, and Matthew Mercer in the television anime. Mercer first learned of the series at an anime convention in 1996, where he was impressed by an episode of Jotaro facing Dio. As a result, Mercer becoming Jotaro's English actor was, according to him, "a huge nerd full circle." In the recording of the early episodes, Mercer was excited with the lines he was given. In the pilot episodes of the dub, while Jotaro was still voiced by Mercer, his Stand, Star Platinum, was voiced by Dio's voice actor, Patrick Seitz. Mercer became the official voice for Star Platinum after the pilot episodes.

== Appearances ==
=== In JoJo's Bizarre Adventure ===
==== Stardust Crusaders ====
A Japanese high school delinquent, Jotaro Kujo, appears as the protagonist of Stardust Crusaders. Jotaro has been arrested, and refuses to leave his cell, believing he is possessed by an evil spirit. After being called by Holly, Joseph's daughter and Jotaro's mother, Joseph arrives with an associate, Muhammad Avdol. They explain that Jotaro's "evil spirit" is actually a manifestation of his fighting spirit, called a Stand, and reveal that they possess Stands as well. Joseph explains that the sudden appearance of their Stands is caused by the nemesis of his grandfather, Jonathan Joestar: Dio. Soon after, Jotaro defeats the first of these assassins, Noriaki Kakyoin, managing to rescue him from the influence of Dio's parasitic flesh bud. Holly soon becomes gravely ill due to a Stand manifesting in her, which is slowly killing her due to her reserved personality. With little hesitation, Jotaro, Joseph, Avdol, and Kakyoin begin a journey to Egypt to kill Dio and save Holly's life. On the way, they are joined by another reformed assassin named Jean Pierre Polnareff, who seeks to avenge his sister, whose murderer is among Dio's forces and Iggy, a troublesome dog who developed a Stand and was captured by Avdol offscreen.

After Avdol and Iggy are murdered by Dio's right-hand Vanilla Ice, the remainders of the group ultimately find Dio and unnerved by his unknown power, escape his mansion as the sun sets. A chase across Cairo follows, leading to Kakyoin confronting Dio and his Stand, The World. Though fatally wounded by The World, Kakyoin deduces the Stand's ability to stop time for a few seconds and relays it to Joseph by using his Stand to damage a nearby clock tower before dying. Joseph is able to pass that information on to Jotaro, but is also fatally wounded by Dio, who uses his blood to increase the duration of his ability. Jotaro then fights Dio alone, slowly discovering that he shares Dio's time-stopping ability, due to Star Platinum having similar abilities to The World. The battle ends with Jotaro defeating Dio using the time-stop ability and subsequently killing him, before transfusing Dio's blood back into Joseph, and destroying the vampire for good by exposing his remains to the sun. Jotaro and Joseph then bid Polnareff farewell before returning to Japan, as Holly has made a full recovery.

==== Diamond is Unbreakable ====
In the fourth story arc, Diamond Is Unbreakable, Jotaro arrives in the Japanese town of Morioh to meet Josuke Higashikata after finding out the latter is Joseph's illegitimate son, intending to inform him of this fact and work out his inheritance. Soon after, along with Josuke, Koichi Hirose and Okuyasu Nijimura, they investigate to find the identity of Red Hot Chili Pepper's Stand user, Akira Otoishi, who stole the Stand-granting Bow and Arrow after killing Keicho Nijimura, Okuyasu's brother. Afterwards, manga artist Rohan Kishibe finds out about a serial killer loose in Morioh from the ghost of one of his victims, Remi Sugimoto. The killer, Yoshikage Kira, goes on to kill Shigekiyo Yangu, a student at Josuke's school, causing Jotaro and the rest of the group to grow suspicious. After almost managing to catch him by following a clue he left behind after Shigekiyo's murder, he barely escapes after a violent battle and assumes the new identity of local businessman Kosaku Kawajiri by using Aya Tsuji's Stand ability. After his identity is eventually discovered by Josuke, Kira attempts to use a paramedic to activate his Stand Killer Queen's new ability, Bites the Dust, and rewind time, but is stopped by Koichi and Jotaro. Kira is then accidentally run over by an arriving ambulance and dies. Following the battle, Jotaro leaves Morioh with an older Joseph Joestar who joined him in his adventure earlier and an invisible baby (due to Stand powers) taken in by Joseph and named Shizuka Joestar .

==== Golden Wind ====
In Golden Wind, Jotaro asks Koichi to go on a mission to Italy. His objective was to get a skin sample of a boy named Haruno Shiobana, which would then be given to the Speedwagon Foundation for analysis. Sometime later, Koichi reported back to Jotaro that Haruno Shiobana, who now goes by Giorno Giovanna, was a Stand user. Jotaro then revealed to Koichi that Giorno was the son of Dio and wanted to get the skin sample to confirm this. However, now knowing that he was a Stand user, Jotaro called off the mission.

==== Stone Ocean ====
In Stone Ocean, Jotaro comes to visit his imprisoned daughter, Jolyne Cujoh, and informs her that a disciple of Dio's framed her so that he could kill her in prison, and urges her to escape. Jolyne is estranged from her father due to his absence in her life growing up. This plan goes awry when a Stand named Whitesnake uses its power to remove Jotaro's Stand and memories, in the form of discs. Jotaro sinks into a deathlike state, and Jolyne vows to find a way to recover the discs from Whitesnake's user, the mysterious prison chaplain Enrico Pucci.

She succeeds in sending both of Jotaro's discs to the Speedwagon Foundation. Jotaro arrives to defend Jolyne and her friends from Pucci. However, Pucci is able to survive and realizes he can use his new Stand C-Moon to replicate the gravitational conditions required for his plan. Unlocking his ultimate stand, Made in Heaven, Pucci speeds up time itself causing the rapid acceleration of the world around Pucci and the Joestar group to create a new universe in his and Dio's image. Pucci aims Made in Heaven to maneuver Jolyne's Stand Stone Free into successfully killing her ally Narciso Anasui, but Jotaro is able to stop time. Made in Heaven's speed is too fast, which forces Jotaro to stop time to see the Stand, and upon saving Jolyne from Pucci's attack, he and Ermes are killed in front of Emporio Alniño, and Jolyne gives her life so Emporio can survive.

The universe then promptly collapses, or "runs out of time". Although Pucci accelerates time once more, creating a new universe, where everything is the same but people have precognition and "fate", Emporio uses Weather Report to kill Pucci. The universe collapses, and another cycle of time leads to a new universe with no precognition and no Pucci. In this new universe, Emporio meet reincarnated Jolyne, Ermes, Anasui, and Weather Report who all go by different names, and with Pucci never existing they never go to jail. Irene and Annakiss, the reincarnations of Jolyne and Anasui, plan to meet reincarnated Jotaro for his approval on their planned marriage.

=== JoJolion ===
Jotaro Kujo himself does not appear in the new universe that began with Steel Ball Run outside of a cameo in a volume-exclusive interlude detailing the mechanics and limitations of Stand abilities. His place in the Joestar bloodline is taken over by the 29-year-old marine surgeon Yoshikage Kira and the 22-year-old housekeeper Kei Kira who takes on the last name Nijimura to disguise her identity. Both infiltrate the Higashikata family to heal their mother Holly Joestar-Kira and end up murdered by the villainous Rock Humans throughout the story, set in 2011, with Holly remaining comatose at the plot's conclusion. The siblings share visual and personality traits with Jotaro but have their own Stands unrelated to Star Platinum. Yoshikage wields a new version of Killer Queen and Kei possesses the autonomous Born This Way.

Yoshikage Kira lives on through JoJolion's protagonist Josuke Higashikata, whose body is a 50/50 equivalent exchange fusion of the mortally wounded Yoshikage and his decade-younger friend Josefumi Kujo. Josuke continues to follow their goal to heal Holly after regaining his memories and swears during the ending to pursue this further despite coming to the conclusion that he is his own person.

=== Other appearances ===
Jotaro appears in the live-action adaption of Diamond is Unbreakable, JoJo's Bizarre Adventure: Diamond Is Unbreakable Chapter I, portrayed by Yusuke Iseya.

Jotaro is a playable character in the following games: JoJo's Bizarre Adventure (1993) for the Super Famicom, JoJo's Bizarre Adventure, JoJo's Bizarre Adventure: All-Star Battle, it's remaster JoJo's Bizarre Adventure: All-Star Battle R, and JoJo's Bizarre Adventure: Last Survivor.

He also appears in the video game JoJo's Bizarre Adventure: Eyes of Heaven. In the story mode Jotaro and his allies, who had just defeated Dio, are attacked by friends and enemies who have either disappeared or died along the way. They are then approached by a young Robert E. O. Speedwagon, who possesses a piece of the Saint's Corpse that allows him to travel through time and space as well as vanquish the evil influence possessing the other characters. He leads Jotaro and his allies on a journey through time, space, and alternate universes, in order to stop another iteration of Dio. This alternate Dio defeated his timeline's version of the Joestars and attained a Stand known as The World Over Heaven, which allows him to rewrite reality. Though Dio succeeds in absorbing the souls of the Joestar lineage and the Saint's Corpse parts, Jotaro manages to defeat him as his Stand develops the same powers since it is the same Stand as The World. After killing Dio once more, Jotaro uses his new powers to rewrite his timeline so that the Joestars and their allies who died in Parts 1-7 survived. He is also shown attempting to be a better father to Jolyne, even bringing her to Morioh with him during the events of Part 4.

The character of Jotaro is also present in the Weekly Shōnen Jump crossover games Famicom Jump II: Saikyō no Shichinin, Jump Super Stars, Jump Ultimate Stars, and Jump Force.

Jotaro in his Stone Ocean appearance and a limited starter pack with him and Jolyne as one character is one of the playable characters of Monster Strike, from July 15 to August 2, 2022, in a collaboration with the anime adaptation of Stone Ocean and in his Stardust Crusaders appearance is a playable character of Puzzle & Dragons in collaborations of the anime and the game's 10th anniversaries from December 26, 2022, to January 9, 2023.

== Cultural impact ==
=== Critical reception ===
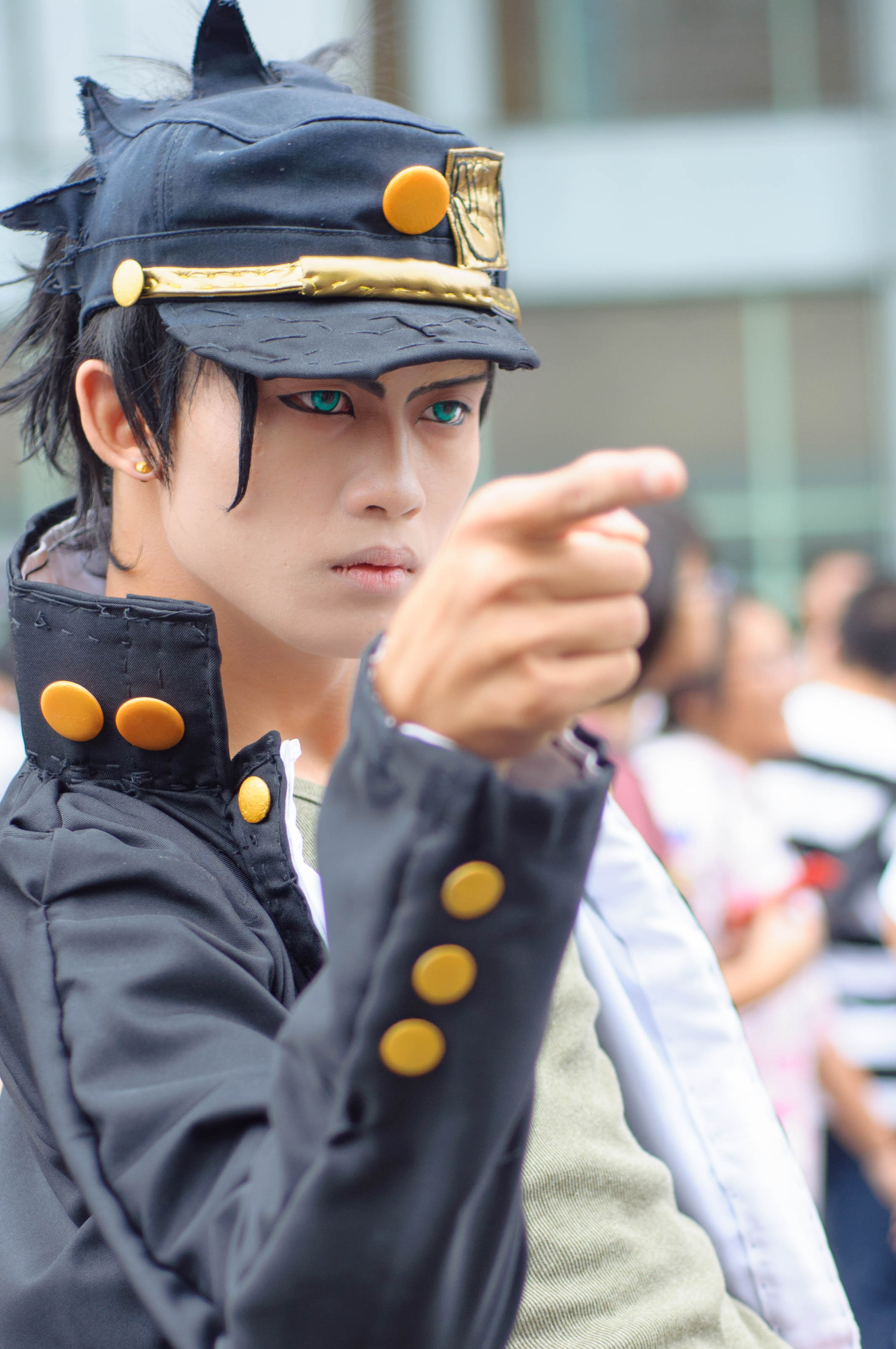
Cosplay of Jotaro at Petit Fancy 21, 2021

Critical reception to Jotaro's character has been very positive. Joel Loynds of The Linc enjoyed the distinct personalities of Jojo's Bizarre Adventure, pointing out how Jotaro's stoicness contrasts with Joseph. Rebecca Silverman of Anime News Network enjoyed seeing Part 2's Joseph team up with Jotaro and noted another element in the narrative was Jotaro's responsibility when dealing with an innocent girl who might act as a weak point. The reviewer suggested a parallel between her and Jotaro and Joseph and Caesar in the previous arc where "ultimately Caesar's protection of Joseph cost him his life." Jordan Richards of AIPT Comics finds Jotaro to be the one the reviewer likes the most out of the characters introduced due to how despite how his introduction making him seem like an unruly delinquent, he has moments that shows his kindness such as willingly putting himself in jail when unaware of his Stand's nature and his desire to save her life despite his rudeness towards her. Gita Jackson of Kotaku liked Jotaro's design, and joked about how the hat is always worn. David King of Bubbleblabber praises Matthew Mercer's portrayal of Jotaro for capturing his rough personality.

Joel Loynds of The Linc praises his Stand, Star Platinum, due to how it fights alongside Jotaro using a barrage of multiple punches while Jotaro constantly yells the Japanese word "Ora". Ian Wolf of Anime UK News praised the fight Jotaro has with the gambler D'Arby, finding it unique among fight sequences presented in shonen demographic as rather than employing brutality, they instead play poker. On the other hand, Nick Creamer from Anime News Network felt that Jotaro was too overpowered due to how he often defeats enemies using brute force in early episodes of Part 3. William Irvine of The Little Hawk feels Jotaro's reveal to be able to stop time as a cop-out as there are barely moments that hints to it and it makes his and Dio's battle as being forced. However, the reviewer notes that their battle is entertaining with some of the best moments to come out of it of the series.

Despite not reaching legal smoking age for Japan in Stardust Crusaders, Jotaro often smokes in the manga series. When the series was adapted into a television series, Jotaro's face was covered in black when smoking. Brian Ashcraft of Kotaku found this censorship as one of the most ridiculous ever done in anime as even though Jotaro's face is covered, his cigar can be clearly seen. Eric Gaede of THEM Anime Reviews criticized how the OVAs primarily focused on Jotaro rather than his allies and criticized his constant yelling when facing Dio.

The Fandom Post enjoyed Jotaro's inclusion in Part 4 and how the characters had to find other antistereotypical ways to defeat villains that avoided brute force. Manga.Tokyo enjoyed the meeting between Jotaro and Josuke for going from an interesting conversation about the Joestar bloodline to an intense fight scene when the former insults the latter's hair. Anime News Network praised how Jotaro interacts with the lead of Part 4, Josuke, finding both characters appealing. David Kalsof of Bubbleblabber enjoys the relationship between Jotaro and Josuke, highlighting their unusual familial relations and the mentor role he displays to the teenager. In a Diamond is Unbreakable festival event, Daisuke Ono performed Jotaro's catchphrase, a multitude of "ora"s. Manga–.Tokyo described it as "a moment any JoJo fan wouldn't want to miss".

In retrospect, Thrilist commented that Jotaro possessed several positive qualities which are in parallel with his daughter during Stone Ocean. IGN felt that Jotaro's decay in Stone Ocean provided an interesting premise for Jolyne to explore in this storyline as she was also felt to be in possession of a Stand more interesting to see play than Star Platinum. Both Polygon and Anime Feminist agreed that Jotaro had become a typical poor father figure to Jolyne, a common trend that anime and manga explore though the former enjoyed how during the series, father and daughter have to work together to defeat the villain showing in the process a more caring side to his persona. Jose Arroyo of The Review Geek in the review of the first batch dislikes how quickly their relationship has resolved as he believes there are barely any emotional moments between the two that is deserving of Jolyne's forgiveness and it ends up being rushed and unearned. Thus, in his review of the second batch, he praises the handling her newfound appreciation towards Jotaro better as it includes a heartfelt moment between the two. Jose Arroyo's review during the third batch expresses happiness of Jotaro and Jolyne's reunion and Jotaro witnessing her maturity and showcasing his pride.

=== Popularity and legacy ===
Jotaro has been used as a piece of merchandise including super action figures, Nendoroids, earphones sets, clothes, smart watches, and chocolates. An attraction in Cinema 4-D based on the fight between Jotaro and Dio Brando had been created by Universal Studios Japan. IGN listed Jotaro as one of the best anime characters of all time.
