= Dio Brando =

Fictional character and main antagonist of JoJo's Bizarre Adventure

- JoJo's Bizarre Adventure character
- Dio next to his Stand, The World, as they appear in the third story arc, Stardust Crusaders
- First appearance: JoJo's Bizarre Adventure chapter 1, "Dio the Invader" (January 1, 1987)
- Last appearance: JoJo's Bizarre Adventure chapter 110: "The Radio Gaga Incident, Part 2" (August 19, 2021)
- Created by: Hirohiko Araki
- Voiced by: Japanese: Norio Wakamoto (1992); Nobuo Tanaka (1993–94, 2000–02); Isshin Chiba (1998); Hikaru Midorikawa (2006–07); Kenji Nojima (2006; young); Takehito Koyasu (2012–present); English: Kid Beyond (2002); Patrick Seitz (2014–present)

In-universe information
- Species: Vampire (formerly human)
- Gender: Male
- Family: Dario Brando (father); Unnamed mother; George Joestar I (adoptive father); Jonathan Joestar (adoptive brother/last owner of body)
- Children: Giorno Giovanna (son); Donatello Versus (son); Rikiel (son); Ungalo (son)
- Nationality: English
- Stand: The World
- Date of birth: 1867
- Date of death: January 16, 1989 (age 122)
- Cause of death: Head split in two due to Stand's destruction by Jotaro Kujo; body later reduced to ashes by exposure to sunlight

Dio Brando (Japanese: ディオ・ブランドー, Hepburn: Dio Burandō), later known mononymously as DIO (DIO(ディオ)), is a fictional character and a primary antagonist in the Japanese manga series JoJo's Bizarre Adventure written and illustrated by Hirohiko Araki. He is featured initially as the main antagonist of the series' first part, Phantom Blood, and later returns as the main antagonist of the series' third part, Stardust Crusaders, now solely referred to as DIO. In the alternate universe of the series' seventh part, Steel Ball Run, a character named Diego Brando (ディエゴ・ブランドー, Diego Burandō) bears resemblance to Dio and appears as a secondary antagonist.

The poor son of Dario Brando, an abusive alcoholic who worked Dio's mother to death, Dio first appears as a young misanthrope who, via the power of an ancient stone mask, becomes an immortal vampire. A century after the events of the first part, he resurfaces as the user of the time-stopping Stand named The World. As the series' most prolific villain, his defining trait is his staunch ambition, which develops into a "might makes right" philosophy and a drive for absolute control through absolute power.

== Creation and design ==
When beginning the series, Dio was the character that Araki looked forward to drawing the most. He also revealed that he had not thought up a weakness for the character and that it was difficult to come up with a way for Dio to be defeated. In regard to Dio's characterization, Araki said that he was inspired by FBI profiling of Serial killers, admitting that in a way he thinks they must be incredibly strong to be able to commit the heinous crimes that they do. How serial killers control their victims through psychological manipulation interested Araki as well, a trait similar to how Dio uses his charisma to ensure his followers to do his bidding. Araki intended to characterize Dio as unapologetically baleful in his pursuit of power, with his literal abandonment of his humanity reflecting his figurative and emotional one. Araki wanted his name to sound cool next to JoJo's, so he chose Dio, the Italian word for God.

Araki said that he wanted Dio to embody the "attractiveness of evil" and created him to be a "beautiful, attractive young man". In classic villain style, his eyes are slightly slanted and he shows dimples and fangs when smiling. His hair is blond to contrast with Jonathan's black hair. Dio's appearance was inspired by western idols, and in a separate interview Araki specifically mentioned the short hairstyle and muscles of Rutger Hauer's character Roy Batty from the 1982 film Blade Runner influencing Dio's design. The author brought in the vampire element in order to depict a dark world that had rarely been seen in Weekly Shōnen Jump up to that point. Although the character is popular with women in the story, Araki said Dio is more interested in dominating than loving. In regards to his sexuality, Araki stated in a 2007 interview that "[Dio's] sort of a composed character that could go either way. [He] could go with a man or a woman."

Some of Dio's mannerisms and phrases, such as his frequent cries of "Muda" (無駄; "useless") and "WRYYYYY" (ウリイイイイ, Uriiiii) or the quote "Kono Dio da!" (このディオだ!; "It was me, Dio!"), have yielded several Internet memes and other popular culture references.

== Appearances and influences ==
=== Phantom Blood ===
In Phantom Blood, the child of an abusive drunkard named Dario Brando, Dio Brando becomes the adopted brother of Jonathan Joestar by using a promise that Jonathan's father, George Joestar, made to Dario years ago. Upon entering the Joestar estate after his father died, Dio tried to take everything from Jonathan, starting by killing Jonathan's dog, Danny. However, Dio underestimated Jonathan, and his retaliation for forcefully kissing Erina Pendleton causes Dio to spend the next seven years feigning to be Jonathan's friend. At one point, George becomes bedridden with an illness, and Jonathan not only discovers that Dio is poisoning him in order to steal the Joestar fortune, but realizes that Dio had also killed Dario using the same poison. With his true colors exposed, Dio decides to murder Jonathan with an ancient Aztec stone mask.

However, Dio learns that, instead of killing, the mask transforms the wearer into a vampire when exposed to blood, and uses it on himself when his plan is exposed, using George's blood after stabbing and killing him. After the resulting fight, Jonathan impales him on a stone statue and leaves him in the burning Joestar mansion. However, Dio survives and uses zombies to take over the small village of Windknight's Lot. Jonathan is sought out by Will A. Zeppeli, a master of an ancient martial art called Hamon, which can kill vampires and zombies. Zeppeli reveals Dio's survival, and teaches Jonathan how to use Hamon as Dio sends zombies to kill him and begin his quest to take over the world. Jonathan seemingly defeats him again, but Dio survives by decapitating himself before Johnathan's Hamon can destroy his brain. He and a surviving zombie, Wang Chan, attack Jonathan on a steamship during his honeymoon with Erina in an attempt to claim his enemy's body for his own. While Dio fatally punctures his throat, Jonathan overloads the ship's engines by using his Hamon. Dio is seemingly killed by the resulting explosion. Erina, pregnant with Jonathan's son, escapes unharmed along with an orphaned girl.

=== Battle Tendency ===
As he is dormant at the bottom of the ocean, Dio Brando does not appear in Battle Tendency, but the aftermath of his apparent death at the hands of Jonathan Joestar affects the plot. It is ultimately revealed that Jonathan and Erina's son George Joestar II, a famed pilot of the Royal Air Force in World War I, was murdered by one of Dio's zombies who survived the battle at Windknight's Lot and had infiltrated the RAF. George II's wife, Elizabeth, the orphaned newborn who survived the ship explosion with Erina, hunted down this zombie and used Hamon to kill him. However, as no-one else knew that he was a zombie, she became a wanted murderer and was forced into hiding under the name Lisa Lisa. This was done with the help of the Speedwagon Foundation that was founded by Robert E. O. Speedwagon. Lisa Lisa later reunites with her son Joseph Joestar, teaches him Hamon so he can defeat the Pillar Men. Their leader, Kars, is revealed to be the creator of the stone masks and was indirectly responsible for Dio's transformation into a vampire.

=== Stardust Crusaders ===
It is revealed in Stardust Crusaders that Dio survived the ship's explosion by decapitating Jonathan's corpse and attaching his own head to it as the ship sank and remained inside of a casket at the bottom of the ocean for a century until he was unintentionally retrieved by a shipwreck salvage operation in 1983. Dio escaped the coffin through a secret layer of the coffin. Now known mononymously as "DIO", he soon meets the mystic Enya Geil who awakens his Stand, The World (世界(ザ・ワールド), Za Wārudo), which is named after the tarot card and allows him to temporarily stop the passage of time. He also acquires a Hermit Purple-like Stand that is possessed by Jonathan's body. As his head is attached to Jonathan's body, Dio's acquisition of The World also awakens Stand abilities in all of Jonathan's living descendants. While Joseph Joestar and his grandson Jotaro Kujo have the resolve to control their Stands, Joseph's daughter and Jotaro's mother, Holy, has her very life sapped away by her own Stand because of her gentle disposition. This spurs Jotaro and Joseph to track down Dio along with their friends Mohammed Avdol, Noriaki Kakyoin, Jean-Pierre Polnareff, and Iggy the Boston Terrier to kill him once and for all, freeing Holy from the curse the Stand has trapped her under.

Dio responds by sending other Stand users to assassinate the Joestars before they can find him in his mansion lair in Cairo, some of whom (namely Kakyoin and Polnareff) he had previously mind controlled and joined the Joestars on their journey after being saved by them. Along the way, Avdol and Iggy are killed by Dio's right-hand man Vanilla Ice, who in turn is killed by Polnareff. Dio kills Kakyoin in combat, and then kills Joseph in front of Jotaro. During his battle with Jotaro, Dio is severely injured, and resorts to draining Joseph of his blood, not only healing himself but also finally completing his unification with Jonathan's body, which greatly strengthens his vampiric abilities and his Stand. But Jotaro's Stand, Star Platinum, proves to be The World's equally powered counterpart. After much effort, fuelled by the rage of his friends and grandfather's deaths as well as his mother's dwindling health, taking advantage of Dio's pride and desire to test his strengthened abilities, Jotaro awakens his own time-stopping powers and overpowers Dio with Star Platinum, successfully defeating him on the Qasr El Nil Bridge. Jotaro and the Speedwagon Foundation doctors revive Joseph via a blood transfusion from Dio/Jonathan's body. Then Joseph and Jotaro take their ancestors body out into the desert and expose it to sunlight, which disintegrates it vanquishing the vampire for good, ending the century long battle between the Joestars and Dio, saving Holy, and finally allowing Jonathan Joestar to rest in peace after so many years.

=== Diamond Is Unbreakable and Golden Wind ===
Dio is not present in either Diamond Is Unbreakable or Golden Wind, but his influence on the story is still present.

In Diamond Is Unbreakable, it is revealed that Dio acquired his Stand by means of an ancient artifact known as the "Bow and Arrow", which has reappeared in the fictional Japanese town of Morioh because the children of one of Dio's former lackeys, Mr. Nijimura, are seeking out someone who can possibly kill their father and put him out his misery due to the mutation that he has suffered as a result of Dio's death. It is also revealed that Dio's awakening of Stands in the Joestar family also affected protagonist Josuke Higashikata, Joseph's illiegimate son. But due to his young age at the time, Josuke became afflicted with the same illness as Holy during the events of Stardust Crusaders.

In Golden Wind, the protagonist Giorno Giovanna is Dio's son, but because Dio was in possession of Jonathan's body at the time of Giorno's conception, Giorno is biologically both Dio and Jonathan's son and thus a member of the Joestar family, and his own virtuous soul prevents him from becoming evil as Dio was, thanks to his encounter with a heroic gangster in his childhood life.

=== Stone Ocean ===
Dio's influence on JoJo's Bizarre Adventure returns in Stone Ocean, where it is revealed that he met the story arc's main antagonist, Father Enrico Pucci, shortly before the events of Stardust Crusaders. He told Pucci of his desire to use his Stand, The World, in order to reach "Heaven", and befriended the young priest in order to help him achieve his goal. Pucci's reverence for Dio drives him to carry out his plan decades later. He manipulates events to frame Jotaro Kujo's daughter Jolyne Cujoh for murder in order to trap her in Green Dolphin Street Prison, where he serves as a chaplain. Pucci uses one of Dio's bones to evolve his Stand to reset reality in what he believes is Dio's vision of Heaven; a world that is not only free of the Joestar bloodline, but one where all of humanity is aware of their own destiny. However, he was defeated by Emporio, Jolyne's last surviving ally. This reverts reality, but there are some changes, including the erasure of Pucci. Stone Ocean also introduces Dio's three other children: Ungalo, Rikiel, and Donatello Versus.

=== Steel Ball Run ===
Dio Brando himself does not appear in Steel Ball Run, set in a new continuity. He is thematically succeeded by a similar character named Diego Brando (ディエゴ・ブランドー), nicknamed Dio. Like Dio of the original continuity, Diego is the child of an abusive household, and one who reveres his mother. She instilled in him a sense of pride that he took with him as he became a masterful jockey in his adulthood. He decides to take part in the Steel Ball Run horse race across the United States. He encounters the protagonists Johnny Joestar and Gyro Zeppeli and is controlled by Dr. Ferdinand's Stand Scary Monsters (スケアリーモンスターズ, Sukearī Monsutāzu), which transforms him into a dromaeosaurid dinosaur. After Dr. Ferdinand is defeated, Diego absorbs the left eye of the Saint's Corpse, giving him control of his dinosaur transformation. Later, Diego is hired by President of the United States Funny Valentine in his quest to find the pieces of the Saint's Corpse scattered along the racecourse, but after fighting against Johnny and Gyro, he realizes that President Valentine's plans are more dangerous to the world as a whole and joins them in an attempt to stop him, but dies during his quest.

Before Valentine is killed by Johnny, he uses his Stand's powers to summon a Diego Brando from an alternate universe. This Diego possesses The World, the same Stand as the original Dio Brando. He manages to defeat Johnny Joestar in battle and wins the Steel Ball Run, in addition to obtaining all of the Saint's Corpse and hiding it in a secure location. However, Lucy Steel uses the severed head of her universe's Diego Brando to obliterate his head through the effects of Valentine's Stand.

The original Dio cameos in a volume-exclusive interlude detailing the mechanics and limitations of Stand abilities.

=== JoJolion ===
Dio makes a brief cameo appearance with the Stone Mask during the events of "The Wonder of You" arc.

== Abilities ==
Primarily, Dio Brando is characterized by his cunning and careful consideration. It is when Jonathan Joestar defeats him in battle and thwarts his deliberate machinations, that Dio dons the Stone Mask that grants him the power of a vampire. He attains superhuman speed, laser eyes, regeneration fueled by sucking blood through his fingers, and strength insofar as he can lift a road roller with ease - a frequent source of references in popular culture.

As a vampire, he most frequently uses an exaggerated evaporated cooling form of freezing known simply as the Vaporative Freezing Technique (気化冷凍法, Kikareitōhō) that allows him to freeze his opponents while rendering direct attacks with Hamon useless. While powerful, it does not kill people instantly (seen at the end of Phantom Blood, a victim of the attack survives - although he died shortly after.) Another vampiric technique available to Dio is Space Ripper Stingy Eyes (空裂眼刺驚(スペースリパー・スティンギーアイズ), Supēsu Ripā Sutingī Aizu) that allows him to shoot two pressurised fluid jets from his eyes. He can also graft body parts of different beings together, an ability he then used to take Jonathan Joestar's body as his own.

Once he returns 100 years later with Jonathan's body, Dio developed his signature Stand, The World, after being struck by the Bow and Arrow. As a psychic manifestation of Dio, it has all of his aforementioned superhuman abilities and facilitates melee attacks, though its signature ability is to stop time. This time-stopping ability only lasts for a limited amount of time, though this limit can be extended through practice or drinking Joseph Joestar's blood. In addition, Dio gained access to a second Stand through the use of Jonathan's body; this unnamed Stand bears a resemblance to Joseph Joestar's Hermit Purple, and has the ability of divination.

=== Steel Ball Run ===
Dio's Part 7 counterpart, Diego Brando, first encounters Scary Monsters when he comes into conflict with its original user, Dr. Ferdinand. Ferdinand "infects" Diego, as well as an entire village, transforming them into dinosaurs. After gaining the left eye of the Saint's Corpse, Diego gains his own version of Scary Monsters that allows him to transform himself or others into dinosaur versions of themselves, partially or entirely. Scary Monsters grants Diego increased strength, speed, healing, and "dynamic vision". Dynamic vision provides Diego with excellent eyesight; however, he can only see objects that are moving, similar to that of the Tyrannosaurus Rex in Jurassic Park.

After Diego's death by the hands of Funny Valentine, Valentine summons a Diego from an alternate universe. This Diego possesses The World like Part 3's Dio, and can also stop time. The design of Diego's The World is very similar to that of Part 3, apart from its skinnier profile and the replacement of the hearts on The World's knees for capital D's.

== Voice actors ==
Dio has had many different voice actors in different types of media. He was first voiced by Norio Wakamoto in the 1993 drama CDs, followed by Nobuo Tanaka in the OVAs and Isshin Chiba in the 1998 video game. He is voiced by both Kenji Nojima and Hikaru Midorikawa in the Phantom Blood video game and 2007 animated film as the younger and older incarnations, respectively. In the 2012 television anime and in various subsequent media, he and his Steel Ball Run counterpart Diego are voiced by Takehito Koyasu. In the 2026 Steel Ball Run anime, Diego is set to be voiced by Kaito Ishikawa.

Dio has had three English voice actors; he was voiced by Kid Beyond in the OVAs, and by Patrick Seitz in the TV anime. Damien Haas will voice Diego in the 2026 Steel Ball Run anime.

== In other media ==
Dio Brando has appeared in many video games related to the JoJo's Bizarre Adventure franchise, usually as a player character or a boss. Some games include multiple versions of the character; in JoJo's Bizarre Adventure: Eyes of Heaven for example, both Dio Brando from Phantom Blood and DIO from Stardust Crusaders are playable characters, along with Diego Brando and Parallel World Diego from Steel Ball Run. Furthermore, he has appeared as a playable character in several crossover video games, such as Jump Super Stars, Jump Ultimate Stars, and Jump Force.

Dio, Gone to Heaven (天国に到達したDIO, Tengoku ni Tōtatsu-shita Dio) is the main antagonist in the story mode of JoJo's Bizarre Adventure: Eyes of Heaven, being a version of Dio from an alternate universe where he killed the Joestar Group in the 1980s and executed his vision of "obtaining heaven" by sacrificing 36 evil souls and subjugating his world with the reality-writing power of his evolved Stand "The World Over Heaven" (ザ・ワールド・オーバーヘブン, Za Wārudo Ōbā Hebun). Dio learns of alternate realities from Funny Valentine, seeking to control all universes through the Saint's Corpse, and uses his more advanced powers over time to revive fallen heroes and villains to either serve him in preventing Jotaro Kujo and the other Joestars from obtaining the complete Saint's Corpse or use them to gather the parts so he can steal them and achieve ultimate power.

== Reception ==
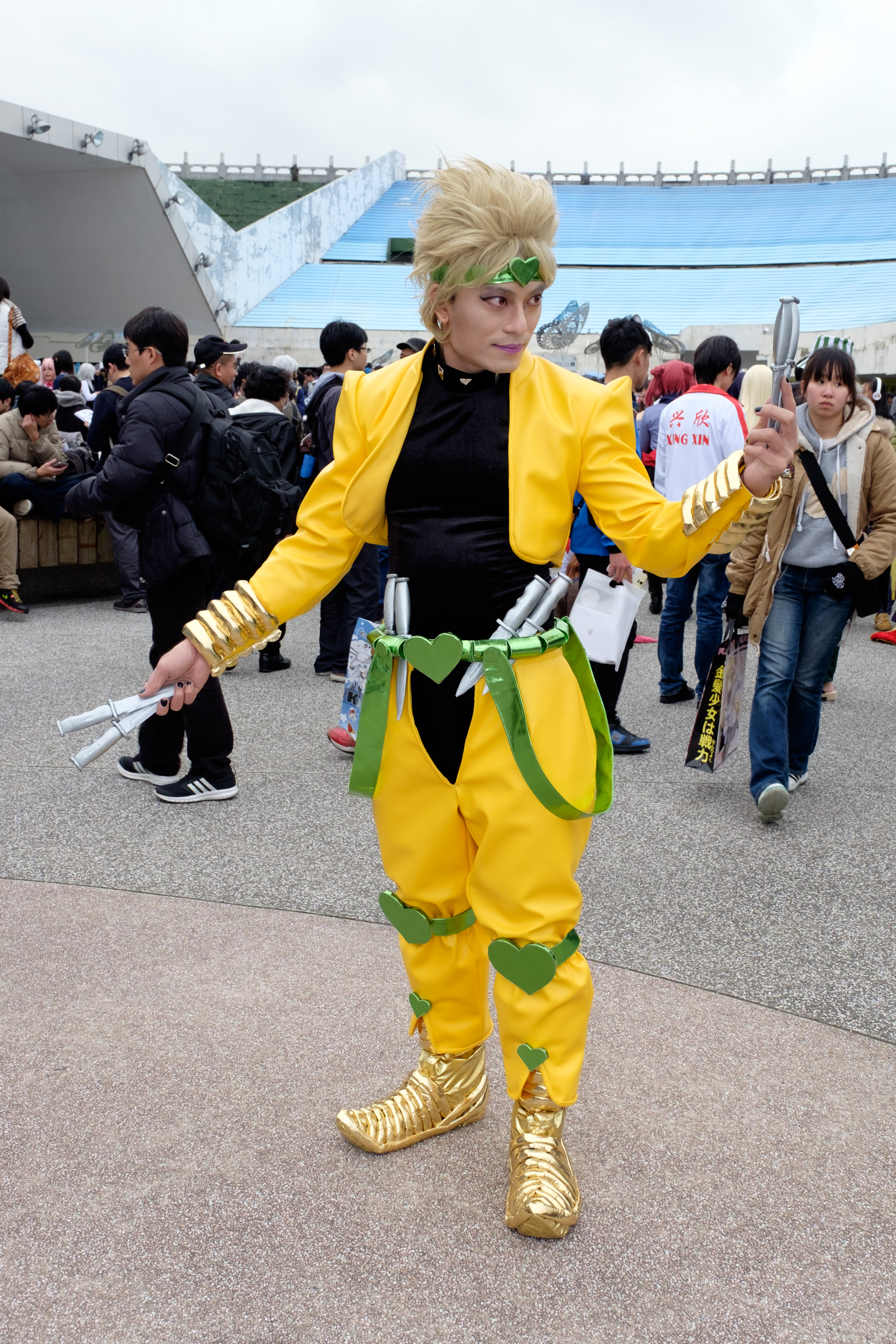
Cosplay of Dio at Fancy Frontier 27, 2016

Dio has generally received praise from various reviewers of manga, anime, and other media; most praised his frightening and enjoyably evil personality making an appealing antagonist, as well as his influence on the rest of the series. Rebecca Silverman of Anime News Network notes that his far-reaching influence throughout the entire series works especially well as a stark contrast to his humble origins. Her colleague Jacob Chapman called him "one of the greatest supervillains ever invented in any medium." Can Hoang Tran of The News Hub cites the anticipation of Dio's appearance in the 2014 reanimation of Stardust Crusaders to be a driving force of the series' success, later calling him the most rewarding character to play as in the series' video games. Joel Loynds of The Linc wrote "Dio's actions so powerfully and immediately establish his evil... that you will be invested in seeing his evolution even more than you [will be for JoJo]". Dallas Marshall of Green Tea Graffiti writes that Araki's straightforward intention of making the reader hate Dio worked simply and flawlessly, citing Dio's defining character moment as burning the protagonist's dog alive. Jun Yamamoto for Billboard said he "could almost feel the passion and ambition that Jonathan Joestar had in his fight against Dio" when listening to the first opening of the TV series.

Readers of Anime News Network voted Dio number one in a poll of which anime villains would make the best friends in real life for his "cool composure" and "awesome lines".

In February 2013, a life-size statue of Dio was displayed at Wonder Festival to promote the event. Starting in June 2014, Dio began appearing on cans of Japanese java Georgia coffee, as part of a promotion of their Emerald Mountain Black flavor. An attraction in Cinema 4-D based on the fight between Dio and Jotaro Kujo had been created by Universal Studios Japan.

Dio inspired several characters in Japanese anime, manga, and video games draw inspiration. One such example is Sakuya Izayoi from the Touhou Project.
