= Jolyne Cujoh =

Fictional character from JoJo's Bizarre Adventure

- JoJo's Bizarre Adventure character
- Jolyne Cujoh as illustrated by Hirohiko Araki and digitally colored by Shueisha
- First appearance: JoJo's Bizarre Adventure chapter 595 "Stone Ocean, Part 1" (December 7, 1999)
- Last appearance: JoJo's Bizarre Adventure chapter 749 "Made in Heaven, Part 7" (March 17, 2003)
- Created by: Hirohiko Araki
- Voiced by: Japanese: Miyuki Sawashiro (All-Star Battle, Eyes of Heaven); Fairouz Ai (2021–present); English: Kira Buckland

In-universe information
- Full name: Jolyne Cujoh
- Nickname: JoJo
- Family: Jotaro Kujo (father); Unnamed mother
- Relatives: Sadao Kujo (grandfather); Holly Kujo (grandmother); Joseph Joestar (great-grandfather); Suzi Q (great-grandmother); Josuke Higashikata (half-granduncle)
- Nationality: American
- Stand: Stone Free
- Date of birth: Circa 1992
- Date of death: March 22, 2012 (age 20)
- Cause of death: Fatal wounds caused by Stand's destruction via Enrico Pucci's Made in Heaven

Jolyne "JoJo" Cujoh (Japanese: 空条 徐倫, Hepburn: Kūjō Jorīn) is a fictional character in the Japanese manga series JoJo's Bizarre Adventure, written and illustrated by Hirohiko Araki. The main protagonist of the series' sixth story arc, Stone Ocean, Jolyne is falsely accused of murder by Dio's most loyal friend, Enrico Pucci, and sentenced to 15 years in prison. Eventually, from a pendant given to her by her father, Jotaro Kujo, she acquires her Stand, Stone Free (ストーン・フリー, Sutōn Furī), (Note: "Stone Ocean" in official English releases.) which gives her the ability to unravel her body into string. Originally having a strained relationship with him due to his long absence from the majority of her life, she vows to stay in prison in order to save her father and recruits a group of Stand users to help her in her quest to save Jotaro and defeat Pucci.

Araki created Jolyne as he felt that it is necessary of the series to have a female protagonist despite the editorial backlash and believes that the change of perspective towards female characters gives him a chance to show that they are able to fight. Jolyne was initially voiced by Miyuki Sawashiro in JoJo's Bizarre Adventure: All-Star Battle and JoJo's Bizarre Adventure: Eyes of Heaven before being cast in the anime adaptation by Fairouz Ai in Japanese onwards and Kira Buckland in English. Reception of Jolyne has been positive, with many critics praising her complex characterization and development from being a flawed person to becoming a strong-willed character.

== Creation and development ==
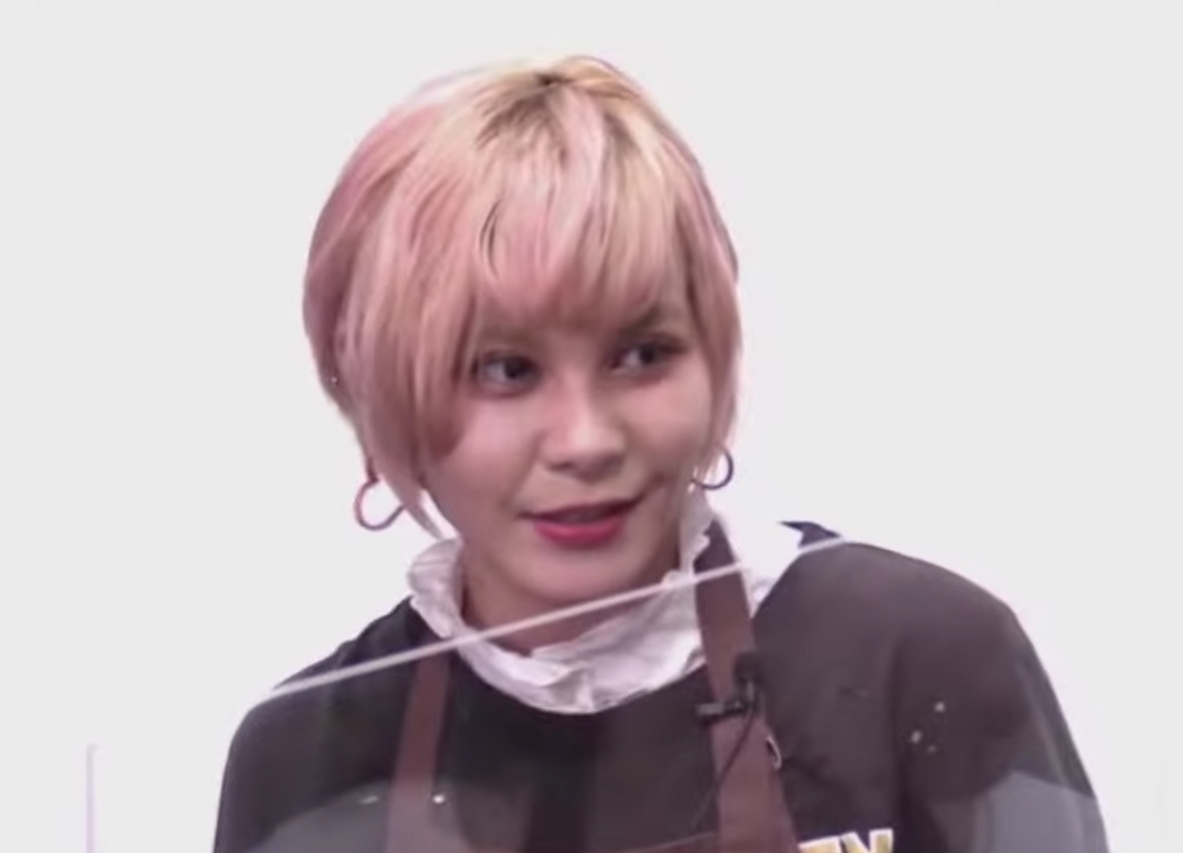
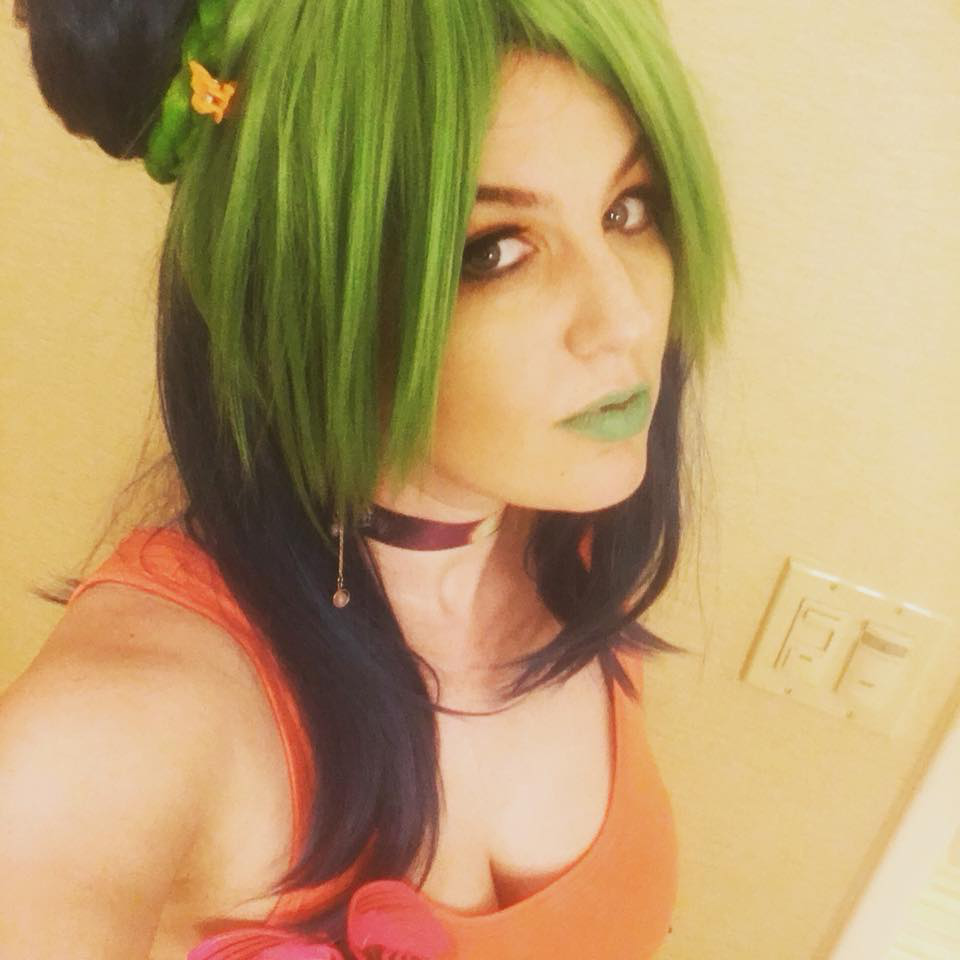
Fairouz Ai (left) and Kira Buckland voice Jolyne in Japanese and English, respectively.

Hirohiko Araki said that during the creation of his two-chapter manga Gorgeous Irene (1985), which features a female protagonist, he felt that a female protagonist would not do well with readers and thus gave up on turning it into a serial. Araki's editor during Stone Ocean's publication, Hideto Azuma, suggested that Jolyne be changed to a man as they could lose the interest of readers. Araki refused, explaining that that reasoning was exactly why Jolyne should be a woman. He has also said that public opinion had changed since the publication of Gorgeous Irene, allowing him to create a female protagonist that could fight and be placed in painful situations. He also felt that Jolyne saving her father shows her internal growth. In creating Jolyne's theme song for the anime, Yugo Kanno explained that since she is the first female protagonist he composed for, he wanted to harmonize her femininity and powerfulness and found it challenging.

In the video games JoJo's Bizarre Adventure: All-Star Battle and JoJo's Bizarre Adventure: Eyes of Heaven, Jolyne was voiced by Miyuki Sawashiro. In the anime adaptation of Stone Ocean, she is voiced by Fairouz Ai. Fairouz first encountered the series during her high school years when she encountered the many notable catchphrases on a video-sharing platform. Curious, she ended up mistakenly buying Stone Ocean, believing it was the first part before finding out about Phantom Blood's existence. She subsequently became a fan of the series and Jolyne Cujoh, referring to the character as her favorite of the series. During her audition, she was nervous and crying, believing she did not show all of her capabilities. The staff surprised her by letting her come with the staff the only people in the room and reciting the lines where she was told she got the role. She was directed to portray Jolyne the way she would be Jotaro's daughter and finds it difficult that she was too determined that her voice became rigid. She was also conscious of portraying the character's determination of saving Jotaro. Fairouz had been told by the director that Jolyne's voice would have to be stronger after episode 13, causing her to re-read the manga to be prepared. She also wanted to make sure that Jolyne does not sound as cool and low-pitch as Jotaro, wanting to make the character distinct vocally. Fairouz initially found it difficult to scream out Jolyne's "Oras", thus she sought out Daisuke Ono, who gave her advice on how to act it out. She reflected on how she had the lowest roles out of the cast and wants to use Jolyne as an opportunity for her career's growth. Though she felt she could not hear it clearly, the staff told her that she was getting better at it.

In the English dub of the anime, Kira Buckland voices the character. She expressed her disbelief and cried when hearing her voice as Jolyne. She had practiced screaming Jolyne's cries of "Ora", and watched timecodes and cues in the animation to know when to stop. She views Jolyne as "a very strong, well-written, nuanced and interesting character".

== Appearances ==
=== In Stone Ocean ===
Jolyne Cujoh and her boyfriend, Romeo Jisso, run over a bystander and she gets falsely accused of the incident after Romeo convinces her to hide the incident and uses her as bait. On her way to Green Dolphin Street Prison, she receives a pendant from her father, Jotaro, and pricks herself with it, gaining a Stand she later names Stone Free. She is visited by her father, who later reveals the incident is a ploy to frame her from one of Dio's followers, who is trying to enact a plan written by Dio in his diary, and attempts to help her to escape. However, a Stand known as Whitesnake steals Jotaro's memories and Stand as DISCs, making him comatose. Realizing the extent of how much her father loved her and his desire to keep her safe, she vows to stay in order to save his life and find the person who is Whitesnake's user. She is then joined by fellow Stand users Emporio Alniño, Ermes Costello, Foo Fighters, Weather Report, and Narciso Anasui.

Tagging along with Weather Report, she goes on a mission to retrieve Star Platinum's DISC and gives it to the Speedwagon Foundation's messenger pigeon for his recovery, succeeding after tricking Whitesnake, whose user is revealed to be Enrico Pucci. Jolyne gets herself sent to the Ultra Security House Unit to find Dio's bone, where she is forced to fight against a couple of Stand users. She and Narciso find the Green Baby, a homunculus formed from Dio's bone, and chase it to make sure it would not meet Pucci. Finally encountering Pucci, she fights him but is forced to make a choice whether to continue fighting him or retrieve Jotaro's memory DISC. She chooses the latter, enabling Pucci to fuse with the Green Baby and gain the Joestar birthmark. After Pucci's escape, Jolyne and Emporio fight against head jailer Miu Miu and, along with Ermes, Anasui and Weather Report, escape the prison. With Foo Fighters and Weather Report dead during the journey and Jotaro Kujo joining the team, they unsuccessfully fight Pucci in Cape Canaveral, who finally evolves his Stand to Made in Heaven. He uses his new power accelerate time around the world in order to create a new universe in his and Dio's image. With Pucci killing everyone except Jolyne and Emporio, she knows that Pucci can sense her thanks to him now having the Joestar birthmark, so she sacrifices herself for Emporio's life.

Pucci halts time's acceleration before completing the cycle in order to kill Emporio but is ultimately killed by the boy, who was given Weather Report's Stand DISC prior to this by Jolyne herself, despite Pucci activating Made in Heaven once more. As a result, a new universe is created. Emporio meets the reincarnations of his friends, including Jolyne, now named Irene (アイリン, Airin), who is considering getting engaged to Anasui's reincarnation, Anakiss, and goes to her father, the reincarnation of Jotaro, to ask his approval.

=== In other media ===
Jolyne also stars in Araki's one-shot manga "Jolyne, Fly High with Gucci", which was published in the February 2013 issue of the women's fashion magazine Spur as part of a collaboration with the Italian fashion brand Gucci. She appears as a playable character in the video games JoJo's Bizarre Adventure: All Star Battle, its remake JoJo's Bizarre Adventure: All Star Battle R, JoJo's Bizarre Adventure: Eyes of Heaven and JoJo's Bizarre Adventure: Last Survivor. Jolyne is one of the playable characters of Monster Strike with a limited starter pack with her and Jotaro as one character from July 15 to August 2, 2022 and Puzzle & Dragons in collaborations of the anime and the game's 10th anniversaries from December 26, 2022, to January 9, 2023.

== Reception ==
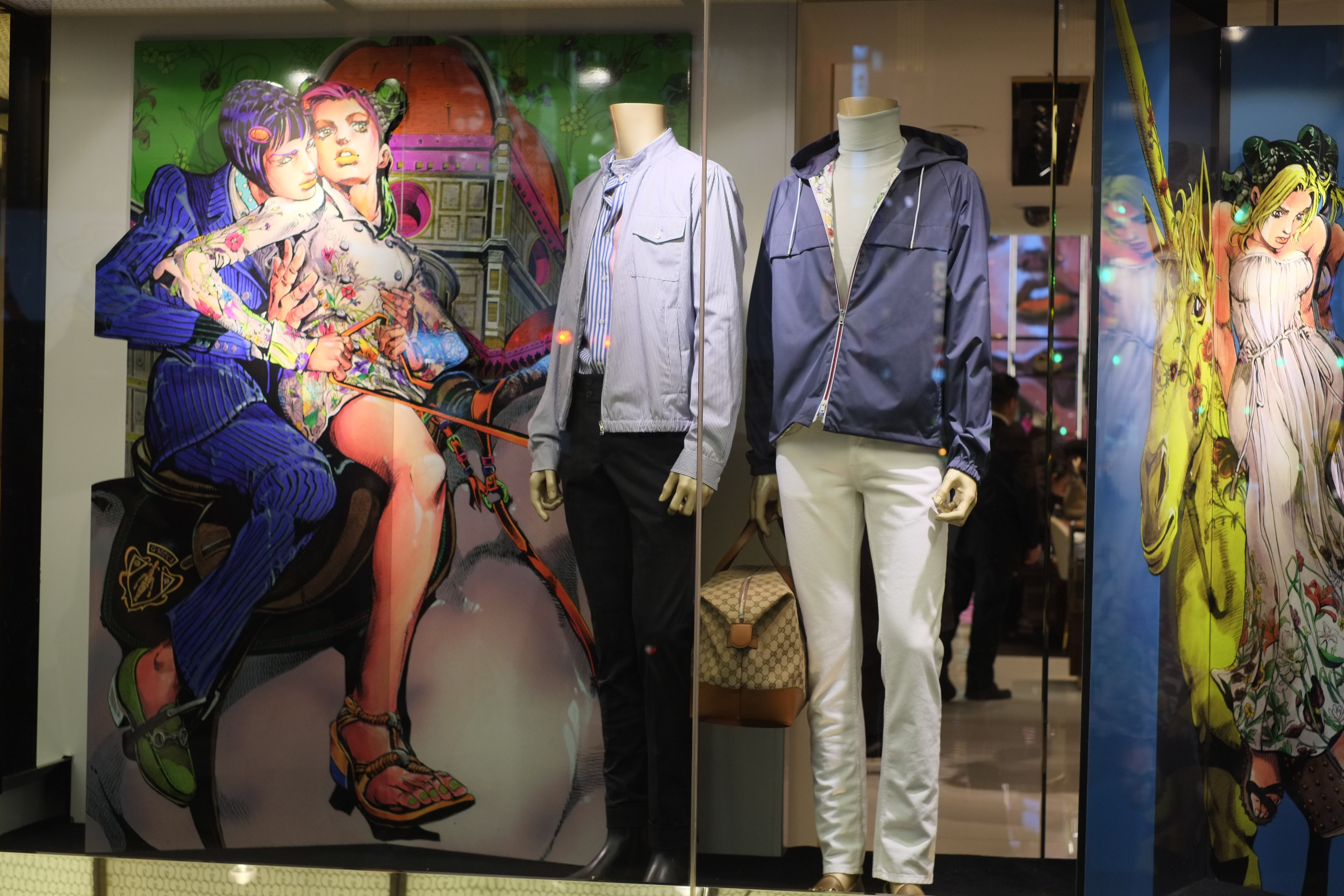
Artwork of Jolyne featured in a 2013 Gucci store display

Jolyne's complexity and character development has been praised by critics. Caitlin Moore of Anime News Network enjoys the appearance of a female JoJo and praises Jolyne's multiple states of emotions without coming across as contradictory and how she and Erina Pendleton show similar development as they are forced to toughen up in their given situations. The reviewer states that every time Jolyne's leitmotif kicks in, it "creates a beautiful sense of recognition, both for her impending victory and a sense that she truly is a continuation of the Joestar line we've been following for generations." In Moore's review on Anime Feminist, she sees Jolyne as relatable, due to showing a lot of vulnerability and having potential for growth, but believes that due to Jolyne being the series' first female protagonist, her lack of control of her power during the first episode is not a great look.

Jose Arroyo of The Review Geek appreciates her similarities with Joseph Joestar and Jotaro Kujo in personality and abandoning her childlike characteristics during her confrontation with Jotaro. Sebastian Stoddard of Anime News Network believes Jolyne to be a well-written protagonist due to being written like a shounen protagonist and that Araki's choice of writing her that way makes her just as dynamic as the male shounen protagonists. Alastair Johns of Comic Book Resources sees Jolyne's impression of being a hot-blooded teenager to be a subversion thanks to becoming a cautious and exploitative person. Francesco Cacciatore of Screen Rant highlights that her flaws make her the best protagonist of the series, noting how her introduction of hiding Romeo's involvement and framing her makes her still guilty, compared to how the previous Joestars would have responded to the situation. The reviewer sees her journey as her redemption and how she evolves into a person worthy of bearing the Joestar bloodline. He concluded that they are what makes her more human-like compared to the rest of the protagonists of the series while still having the Joestar spirit. Cold Cobra of Anime UK News notes how Jolyne is introduced as a meek person before gradually becoming more confident and used to her harsh situation, making her a fun character to cheer for. Luke Maguire of FictionTalk sees her as a strong female lead not because of her strength, but because of how her character is developed and finds how she uses her Stand ability creatively as brilliant.

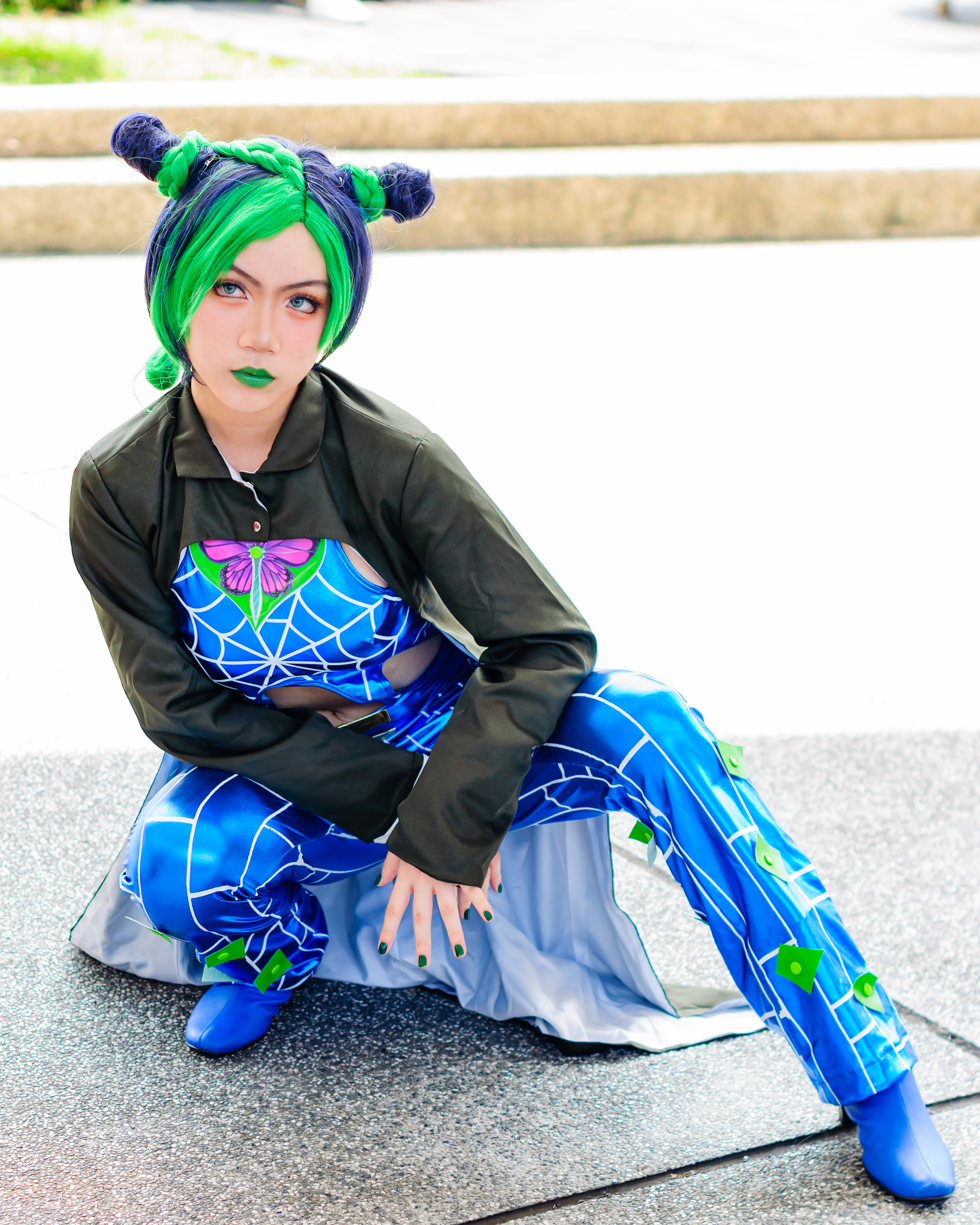
Cosplay of Jolyne at Petit Fancy 34, 2021

Brittany Vincent of IGN comments that Stone Free is an intriguing change from the Stands of the previous Joestars due to her ability to turn into string serves for intriguing combat and creative uses and how it only makes Jolyne an empowering female character.

The focus between the daughter and father relationship between Jolyne and Jotaro Kujo has been thoroughly discussed. Toussaint Egan of Polygon notes how Jotaro and Jolyne are not that different from each other in their respective parts and how his cold personality and parental abandonment made her resent him. The reviewer highlights how in comparison to other parts, Jotaro and Jolyne have to work together and bring up the pain Jotaro had bought into her and sees her desire to save him as a dramatic turning point, as despite how badly damaged their relationship is, both of them clearly loved each other and has a chance to mend it. Jose Arroyo of The Review Geek in the review of the first batch dislikes how quickly how quickly their relationship has resolved as he believes there are barely any emotional moments between the two that is deserving of Jolyne's forgiveness and it ends up being rushed and unearned. Thus, in his review of the second batch, he praises the handling her newfound appreciation towards Jotaro better as it includes a heartfelt moment between the two. Jose Arroyo's review during the third batch expresses happiness of Jotaro and Jolyne's reunion and Jotaro witnessing her maturity and showcasing his pride. Kambole Campbell of Thrillist notes how Jotaro's personality in what makes him cool in Stardust Crusaders is instead deconstructed with Jolyne seeing him as an uncaring father and that is what makes it intriguing and similar to the other relationships throughout the Joestar family. Suzail Ahmad of Game Rant believes that Jotaro's sacrifice leads her to make better decisions, giving her the chance to save him.

In a survey held in the 30th anniversary exhibition, Hirohiko Araki JoJo Exhibition: Ripples of Adventure, Jolyne's hairstyle is ranked as the one voters want to try most.
