= The Star (tarot card) =

Tarot card of the Major Arcana

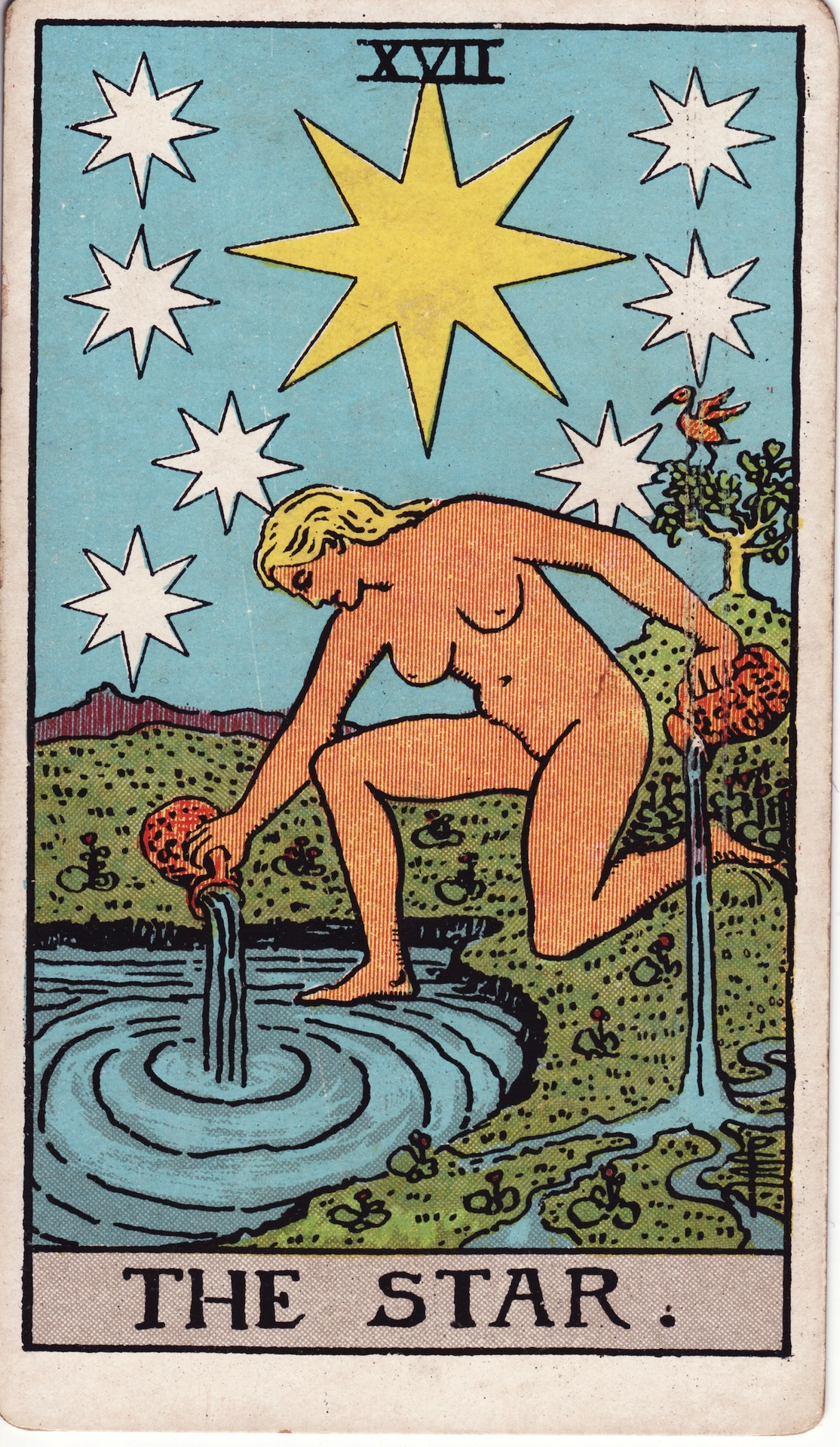
The Star (XVII) from the Rider–Waite tarot deck

The Star (XVII) is the 17th ranking or Major Arcana card in most traditional tarot decks. It is used in game playing as well as in divination.

== Description and symbolism ==
A naked woman kneels by the water; one foot is in the water and one foot is on the land. Above her head is one large star, representing her core essences, and seven smaller stars, representing the chakras. The star is typically eight-pointed, but some late 15th-century depictions depict a six-pointed star instead. In each hand she holds a jug. From one jug she pours a liquid into the water. From the other jug she pours a liquid onto the land. The five senses are represented by the five unique lines formed by water spilled on the ground. Temperance, the 14th Major Arcana card, also has a foot on both land and water while pouring water, but is depicted as standing and rigid. It is the first out of three cards in the Major Arcana to depict celestial imagery. Sometimes three men, representing the three Magi are depicted below the Star.

== Interpretation ==
According to A.E. Waite's 1910 book The Pictorial Key to the Tarot, the Star card carries several divinatory associations:

17.THE STAR.--Loss, theft, privation, abandonment; another reading says-Hope and bright prospects, Reversed: arrogance, haughtiness, impotence.

In astrology, the Star card is associated with the fixed-air sign of Aquarius.

== In popular culture ==
In JoJo's Bizarre Adventure: Stardust Crusaders, the Manga created by Hirohiko Araki, the protagonist Jotaro Kujo uses the stand Star Platinum, named after the Star tarot card.
