= Jonathan Joestar =

Fictional character from JoJo's Bizarre Adventure

- JoJo's Bizarre Adventure character
- Jonathan Joestar, as he appears in Phantom Blood, drawn by Hirohiko Araki.
- First appearance: JoJo's Bizarre Adventure chapter 1, "Dio the Invader" (January 1, 1987)
- Last appearance: JoJo's Bizarre Adventure: Phantom Blood #44, "Fire and Ice, Jonathan and Dio, Part 6" (October 26, 1987)
- Created by: Hirohiko Araki
- Voiced by: Japanese: Hideyuki Tanaka (2006 video game); Kazuya Nakai (2006 video game; young); Katsuyuki Konishi (2007 film); Kazuyuki Okitsu (2012–present); English: Johnny Yong Bosch

In-universe information
- Full name: Jonathan Joestar
- Nickname: JoJo
- Family: George Joestar I (father); Mary Joestar (mother); Dio Brando (adoptive brother)
- Spouse: Erina Pendleton (wife)
- Children: George Joestar II (son); Giorno Giovanna (biological son); Donatello Versus (biological son); Rikiel (biological son); Ungalo (biological son)
- Relatives: Joseph Joestar (grandson)
- Nationality: English
- Stand: Unnamed Stand
- Date of birth: April 4, 1868
- Date of Death: February 7, 1889 (aged 20)
- Cause of death: Mortally wounded in his neck by Dio Brando

Jonathan "JoJo" Joestar (Japanese: ジョナサン・ジョースター, Hepburn: Jonasan Jōsutā) is a fictional character in the Japanese manga series JoJo's Bizarre Adventure, written and illustrated by Hirohiko Araki. Jonathan is the main protagonist of the series' first story arc, Phantom Blood.

== Creation ==
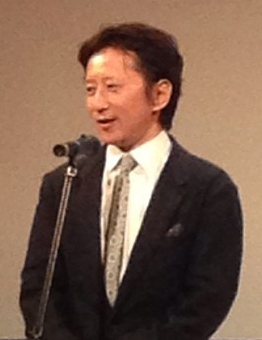
Hirohiko Araki had issues with writing Jonathan due to poor popularity.

Manga author Hirohiko Araki noted that due to the weekly format of the series, Jonathan's initial regression when Dio turns Jonathan's happy life into hardships meant that Jonathan's growth remained in the negative for a few weeks after the series' premiere, leading to a negative feeling that Jonathan always loses. Araki implemented a similar growth curve for Dio, although with him rising towards evil. Despite following the rule of the ever-progressing hero, Araki decided to bend the rule and have Jonathan die to save his wife and child: he acknowledged that dying is as far negative as a hero can go, and called it unthinkable to do such a thing in a shōnen manga, but said that since he wanted to pass down the Joestar family's lineage, he needed Jonathan to die, and for his blood and spirit to be passed to Joseph, the protagonist of Battle Tendency, the second part in the series. While calling it a gamble, he called this passing of the torch a positive that enables the extreme negative of killing the first protagonist.

Jonathan and Dio, the protagonist and antagonist, were created with the duality of light and shadow in mind, with the intention to have them contrast against each other: Dio was depicted as the embodiment of evil, and Jonathan as "fundamentally virtuous" and just. Araki also made use of black and white in his art to further contrast the two. Jonathan was designed to be a symbol for the story and setting, something Araki would continue doing with later protagonists in the series. Because Araki wanted the series to move on with new characters in the Joestar family, Jonathan was specifically written as "the first Joestar" that would function as a symbol of purity and dignity, and not as a unique character. This limited what Jonathan could do; in retrospect, Araki considered him passive and "a bit boring". Jonathan's physical transformation during the seven year skip was done with his upcoming battle with Dio in mind and inspired by muscular film actors popular at the time, such as Arnold Schwarzenegger and Sylvester Stallone. A fan of karate manga as a child, Araki also wanted JoJo to exude an aura of strength like in Karate Baka Ichidai, leading to the character learning the supernatural Hamon technique.

In creating the manga's generational story, Araki thought much about death and the legacy people leave behind in their lives for their descendants, after the death of his grandfather. He took inspiration from the American television series Roots: The Saga of an American Family, and the novel East of Eden. Roots follows the life of African-American slave Kunta Kinte and his descendants, which while watching Araki began to see as a story of family at heart as opposed to one about slavery and racial discrimination. East of Eden's story centered around the intertwined destiny and rivalry of two families, as they pass the torch down to their offspring. He thought highly of stories that could replace its protagonist and still do well. This influenced Araki's decision to ultimately kill Jonathan Joestar and write a generational story as opposed to focusing on a single protagonist, passing on his "Spirit" to his own descendants.

== Appearances ==
The protagonist of Phantom Blood, Jonathan is the son of George Joestar I who carries his surname with pride while striving to be a gentleman who never betrays his code of honor and defending those in need even when at a grave disadvantage. He is a passionate person, he wants to be the best at everything that he does, whether it is fighting or even table manners. Jonathan's life becomes one of misery when Dio Brando is adopted by George, eventually resulting in his father's death as Dio sought to kill both of them. This motivates Jonathan to learn how to utilize Hamon energy from Will A. Zeppeli to settle the score with Dio, though his power later increases drastically when a dying Zeppeli transfers his remaining Hamon into him. Though Jonathan defeats Dio and marries his childhood sweetheart, Erina Pendleton, who bears his son George Joestar II, he is nevertheless fatally wounded by Dio's severed head during an attempt to take his body. Jonathan ultimately dies of his injuries, but not before further injuring the already severely weakened Dio and using his Hamon to cause an explosion on the ship that they and Erina are traveling aboard, with Jonathan successfully persuading Erina to escape alongside an infant (Note: Lisa Lisa) orphaned by Dio's zombies by using Dio's coffin as a makeshift lifeboat.

Despite his death, Jonathan nevertheless has an influence throughout almost the entirety of the series thereafter; this is most noticeable in Stardust Crusaders, where it is revealed that Dio managed to discard Jonathan's head and gain his body as his own. Upon his return, Dio awakens his Stand, although doing so directly awakened one within Jonathan's body and indirectly awakened Stands within Jonathan's descendants, which in turn sets the plot of the part in motion. However, Jonathan's final effort was not in vain, as it weakened Dio to the point of him requiring blood from a Joestar descendant in order to both fully fuse with Jonathan's body and gain proper control of his respective Stand.

In addition to Stardust Crusaders, Jonathan's influence is present, yet very subtle, in three other parts of the series. In Battle Tendency, his significantly potent Hamon results in his grandson Joseph not only inheriting the ability to use Hamon, but also having an inherent aptitude for it. The orphan that Jonathan requested Erina to rescue is also revealed to be Elizabeth "Lisa Lisa" Joestar, who became the wife of his deceased son George II, the mother of Joseph, and an expert in Hamon. In Golden Wind, it is revealed that Jonathan is the biological father of the part's protagonist, Giorno Giovanna, due to Dio's impregnation of a Japanese woman some time after his return, having taken over Jonathan's body. In Stone Ocean, three antagonistic Stand users (Donatello Versus, Rikiel, and Ungalo) are revealed to also be Jonathan's biological sons, albeit with personalities that are based on specific facets of Dio's personality and lack any influence from Jonathan's personality. In addition, one of Jonathan's bones is an integral fail-safe for Dio's desire of "achieving Heaven".

Steel Ball Run, set in a rebooted-universe introduces a version of Jonathan named Johnny Joestar who was a Kentucky-born horse racing prodigy that got paralyzed from the waist down. He participates in the Steel Ball Run competition to have Gyro Zeppeli teach him to use the Spin technique to regain his mobility while developing his Stand Tusk. Like Jonathan in the original universe, Johnny died in his twenties after being married with the following parts, JoJolion and The JoJoLands, depicting the lives of his descendants.

== Reception ==
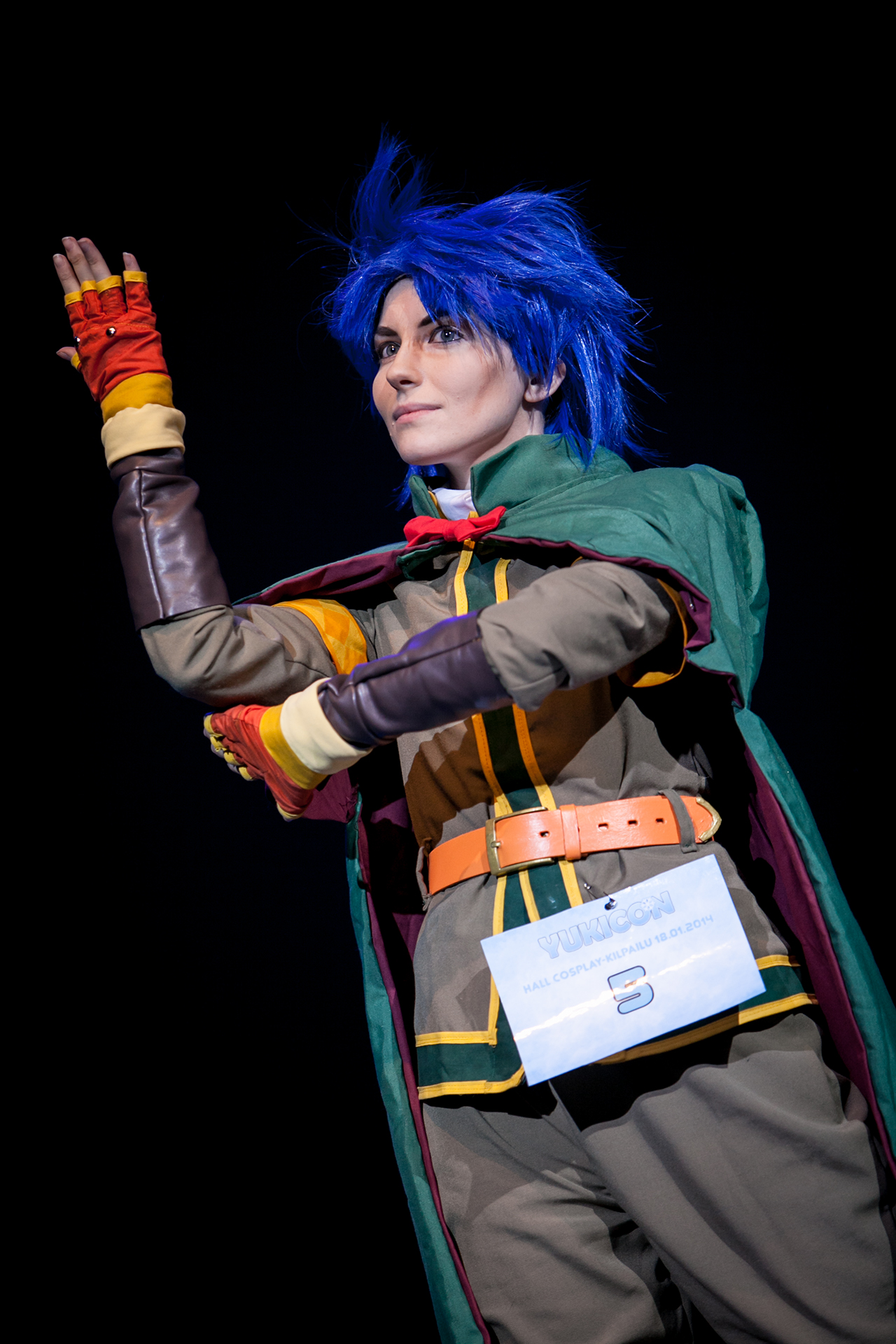
Cosplay of Jonathan at Yukicon 2014

Critical response to Jonathan's character was often mixed. Weekly Shōnen Jump readers were critical of the first few chapters, finding Jonathan unlikable as he kept losing against Dio at that point. Claire Napier of ComicsAlliance was critical of the romance Jonathan has with his girlfriend as she is more prominent in the narrative to make the character become more powerful to fight Dio. Napier claimed that Araki knew little about writing a realistic female character and only used her as a plot device for Jonathan's development. Despite the heavy criticism in regards to Part 1, Napier added "I liked when Jonathan lights his gloves on fire to punch Dio out. That's it. That's my full defense." Rebecca Silverman of Anime News Network described Jonathan as "not only the world's burliest pre-teen, he's also the sweetest, and having never before been faced with such cruelty, he doesn't know what to do" and views him as a weaker character than the villain Dio. Similarly, Otaku USA said that despite his innocence, Jonathan was a "bland, passive character suited" due to how weak he is written when dealing with Dio. Rice Digital referred to Jonathan's portrayal as "mildly generic anime hero beginning stuff" during early chapters of the manga. In retrospect, Comic Book Resources regards Jonathan as "overrated" and at the same time the best protagonist from Araki's series. Silverman felt positively about how strikingly different the protagonist Joseph is from Part 1's Jonathan due to the former's cockier personality. Kotaku described Joseph as a better main character than Jonathan for his display of intelligence when confronting antagonists.

Kory Cerjak at The Fandom Post still enjoyed the rivalry between the two characters despite the simplicity behind it. Takato at Manga-News also felt the rivalry between Jonathan and Dio was likable based on their different origins which led to their own characterizations. Silverman praised the growth Jonathan has with his powers as he comes as a more heroic figure when dealing with his enemy, with the appeal being something that influenced future manga in retrospect. CGMagazine Online said that Jonathan and Dio's rivalry is the main appeal of Part 1, though the latter comes across as the "highlight". In regards to Jonathan, the reviewer commented that while Jonathan initially is seen as a typical shonen manga hero, his growth into a gentleman would make him more likable. As a result, he enjoyed how Jonathan comes to embarrass his rival in the story. Anime UK News noted that fans of the series often find Jonathan as the worst protagonist within the series, citing multiple "bland" features. However, Anime UK News felt that Jonathan was the only protagonist in the entire manga that undergoes a character arc and thus grows more sympathy for the viewer in his final fight against Dio.

For the anime's opening, "Sono chi no Sadame", Billboard said they "could almost feel the passion and ambition that Jonathan had in his fight against Dio through the music."
