= Stone Ocean =

Sixth story arc of JoJo's Bizarre Adventure

- 15th volume cover, featuring (from left to right) Weather Report (background), Anasui, Ermes, Jolyne, and Emporio

ストーンオーシャン (Sutōn Ōshan)
- Genre: Adventure, supernatural
- Manga
- Written by: Hirohiko Araki
- Published by: Shueisha
- English publisher: NA: Viz Media
- Imprint: Jump Comics
- Magazine: Weekly Shōnen Jump
- Original run: December 7, 1999 – April 8, 2003
- Volumes: 17
- Manga

Fujiko no Kimyō na Shoseijutsu: Whitesnake no Gosan
- Written by: Shō Aimoto
- Published by: Shueisha
- Magazine: Ultra Jump
- Published: December 18, 2021
- Other media
- Original net animation (2021–2022)
- Chronology
- Preceded by: Golden Wind; Followed by: Steel Ball Run
- icon

Stone Ocean (Japanese: ストーンオーシャン, Hepburn: Sutōn Ōshan) is the sixth main story arc of the Japanese manga series JoJo's Bizarre Adventure, written and illustrated by Hirohiko Araki. Set near Port St. Lucie, Florida in 2011, the story follows Jotaro Kujo's estranged daughter Jolyne Cujoh as she serves a 15-year sentence at Green Dolphin Street Prison. When her father's Stand ability and memories are stolen by a follower of Dio, Jolyne takes it upon herself to save her father, break out of prison, and put an end to the thief's grand machinations.

It was serialized in Shueisha's Weekly Shōnen Jump from December 7, 1999, to April 8, 2003, (Note: Debuted in the magazine's first issue of 2000 (cover date January 1), released on December 7, 1999; finished in the magazine's 19th issue of 2003 (cover date April 21), released on April 8 of that same year.) and was collected into 17 tankōbon volumes. In its original publication, it was known as JoJo's Bizarre Adventure Part 6 Jolyne Cujoh: Stone Ocean. (ジョジョの奇妙な冒険 第6部 空条徐倫 ―『石作りの海(ストーンオーシャン)』, JoJo no Kimyō na Bōken Dai Roku Bu Kūjō Jorīn: Sutōn Ōshan). It was preceded by Golden Wind and followed by Steel Ball Run. Viz Media digitally released the manga in English through its Shonen Jump service from January 2022 to December 2024, and released the series in nine hardcover volumes from November 2023 to March 2025.

A 38-episode anime adaptation, JoJo's Bizarre Adventure: Stone Ocean, was released on Netflix from December 2021 to December 2022.

== Plot ==
Jotaro Kujo's daughter, Jolyne Cujoh, is convicted of second-degree murder and sentenced to 15 years in Green Dolphin Street Prison, unknowingly taking the fall for her boyfriend. Prior to her incarceration, Jolyne pricks her finger on a pendant given to her by her estranged father, which is revealed to contain a fragment of a Stand-bestowing Arrow. This causes Jolyne to manifest her Stand, Stone Free, before being visited by Jotaro, who attempts to break his daughter out while revealing that she was framed by a follower of Dio, but it is revealed to be a trap set for Jotaro as a Stand named Whitesnake extracts Jotaro's memories and Star Platinum in the form of two discs, leaving him in a coma. Jolyne realizes the extent of her father's love for her and resolves to recover his discs from Whitesnake's user. She is joined by Emporio Alniño, a boy born in prison after his mother was murdered by Whitesnake; Ermes Costello, who entered prison seeking revenge for her sister's death; and Foo Fighters, a sentient plankton colony created by Whitesnake to protect his stolen Stand discs, which later inhabits the corpse of a dead inmate. They are soon joined by two inmates: a weather-controlling amnesiac, named Weather Report, and Narciso Anasui, who has an unrelenting love for Jolyne.

Whitesnake's user is eventually revealed to be a prison chaplain named Enrico Pucci. Pucci sought Jotaro's memories to learn the details of Dio's written plan to establish heaven on Earth, which Jotaro had destroyed twenty-two years earlier after killing Dio. After retrieving Jotaro's Stand disc and sending it to the Speedwagon Foundation, Jolyne discovers that Whitesnake has used a subordinate to revive one of Dio's bones, which eventually absorbs the souls of several prisoners and forms a homunculus named the Green Baby. Jolyne's group seizes the Green Baby as bait for Whitesnake's user, but Foo Fighters and Anasui are mortally wounded in the ensuing battle, with Foo Fighters using the last of her strength to save Anasui's life and retrieve Jotaro's memory disc. Pucci successfully fuses with the Green Baby and leaves the prison for Cape Canaveral, where the new moon is expected to bring about the heaven Pucci seeks.

Jolyne and her allies escape from prison to pursue Pucci to Orlando, Florida, arranging to give Jotaro's memory disc to the Speedwagon Foundation to revive him while dealing with Pucci's final subordinates, three illegitimate sons of Dio. Weather Report eventually regains his own memory disc and remembers his tragic past as Wes Bluemarine, Pucci's long-lost twin brother. Weather Report unleashes his ability's full extent on Orlando before dying in a confrontation with Pucci, using his final moments to extract his Stand disc for his allies to use. As Pucci reaches Kennedy Space Center, Whitesnake undergoes an evolution into the gravity-manipulating C-Moon and overpowers Jolyne's group. Though Jotaro arrives in time to save his daughter, Pucci realizes that he can use C-Moon to replicate the new moon's gravity, allowing him to complete his Stand's evolution into Made in Heaven, which gives him superhuman speed and exponentially accelerates time (except for living beings). The group makes a desperate stand against Pucci, but Anasui, Ermes, and Jotaro are soon killed, while Jolyne sacrifices herself to allow Emporio to escape as the sole survivor.

Pucci's Stand accelerates time until a new cycle of time occurs, where people have subconscious precognition of their fate. Emporio awakens to find himself back at the Green Dolphin Street Prison. Pucci attempts to kill Emporio to tie up loose ends, only to inadvertently insert Weather Report's Stand disc into the child's head, changing his fate. Pucci reactivates Made in Heaven in order to counter Weather Report, but Emporio uses Weather Report to increase the concentration of the surrounding oxygen to a lethal amount. Poisoned, paralyzed, and unable to deactivate Made in Heaven's ability, Pucci pleads with Emporio to spare him until he can make Made in Heaven's effect permanent. Emporio refuses and declares that fate follows the path of justice as Weather Report obliterates Pucci's head into the floor.

With Pucci's death, Made in Heaven's effect is undone, erasing Pucci and his universe from existence, Emporio finds himself at a gas station near Green Dolphin Street Prison where he encounters a hitchhiker named Eldis who bears an uncanny resemblance to Ermes. As it begins to rain, the two are offered a ride by a couple named Irene and Anakiss, resembling Jolyne and Anasui, who are on their way to meet Irene's father for his marital blessing. Emporio, recognizing the reincarnations of his former friends, tearfully reintroduces himself to Irene. The group departs in Anakiss's car, picking up another hitchhiker resembling Weather Report before driving off in the rain.

== Characters ==
- Jolyne Cujoh (Note: Jolyne Cujoh (空条 徐倫, Kūjō Jorīn)) is an inmate at Green Dolphin Street Prison, and is the daughter of the Stardust Crusaders main protagonist Jotaro Kujo. Her Stand is Stone Free, (Note: Stone Free (ストーン・フリー, Sutōn Furī; "Stone Ocean" in English releases)) which allows her to unravel her body into thread.
- Jotaro Kujo (Note: Jotaro Kujo (空条 承太郎, Kūjō Jōtarō)) returns from Stardust Crusaders and Diamond is Unbreakable as Jolyne's father. Now a middle-aged man, he arrives at Green Dolphin Street Prison to help Jolyne escape prison, only to have his Stand and memories stolen from him. His Stand is Star Platinum, (Note: Star Platinum (星の白金(スタープラチナ), Sutā Purachina)) a powerful close-ranged Stand with immense strength, precision, speed, and the ability to stop time.
- Ermes Costello (Note: Ermes Costello (エルメェス・コステロ, Erumēsu Kosutero)) is an inmate who intentionally had herself incarcerated to take revenge on the gangster Sports Maxx for killing her sister. She acquires the Stand Kiss, (Note: Kiss (キッス, Kissu; "Smack" in English releases)) which allows her to place stickers on anything to create a duplicate of it. When the sticker is removed, the duplicate and the original merge again, inflicting damage.
- Foo Fighters, (Note: Foo Fighters (フー・ファイターズ, Fū Faitāzu; only referred to as "F.F." in English releases)) often shortened to F.F., is a sapient being consisting of plankton. It is its own Stand, with the ability to control the plankton colony as one being or individually, as well as the ability to seal wounds using plankton or possess someone's body. After allying with Jolyne, the Stand assumes the appearance of a deceased prisoner named Atroe. (Note: Atroe (エートロ, Ētoro))
- Emporio Alniño (Note: Emporio Alniño (エンポリオ・アルニーニョ, Enporio Arunīnyo)) is a boy born to an unknown inmate in Green Dolphin Street Prison. His Stand, Burning Down the House, (Note: Burning Down the House (バーニング・ダウン・ザ・ハウス, Bāningu Daun Za Hausu; "Burn The House Down" in English releases)) materializes the 'ghosts' of objects. More precisely, it has the ability to manifest objects which no longer exist, such as those within a former version of the prison building. Following his incarcerated mother's death at Whitesnake's hands, he secretly lives in a ghost room that he created, together with Weather Report and Narciso Anasui.
- Weather Report, (Note: Weather Report (ウェザー・リポート, Wezā Ripōto; "Weather Forecast" in English releases)) born Domenico Pucci and raised as Wes Bluemarine, is an amnesiac inmate who aides Jolyne at Emporio's request. With no memory of his true name, he goes by the name of his Stand, which allows him to manipulate the weather and the atmosphere. Upon regaining his memories, Weather awakens a hidden ability known as Heavy Weather, (Note: Heavy Weather (ヘビー・ウェザー, Hebī Wezā; "Heavy Forecast" in English releases)) which gradually transforms people into snails through subliminal messages embedded within rainbows.
- Narciso Anasui (Note: Narciso Anasui (ナルシソ・アナスイ, Narushiso Anasui; "Narciso Anastasia" in English releases)) is an inmate who is obsessively in love with Jolyne and wishes to marry her, despite the fact that she is clearly not interested in him. His Stand, Diver Down, (Note: Diver Down (ダイバー・ダウン, Daibā Daun; "Diver Drive" in English releases)) allows him to phase himself or his Stand into objects, or into others' bodies to absorb damage dealt to them. Diver Down can then release this energy outward as an offensive counterattack. It can also manipulate the interior structure of the people and objects it phases into.
- Enrico Pucci (Note: Enrico Pucci (エンリコ・プッチ, Enriko Putchi; "Father Pucchi" in English releases)) is a Roman Catholic priest at Green Dolphin Street Prison, and one of Dio's last remaining followers. Pucci uses the Stand Whitesnake, (Note: Whitesnake (ホワイトスネイク, Howaitosuneiku; "Pale Snake" in English releases)) which allows him to extract people's memories and Stand abilities in the form of compact discs; he can also insert discs into others, imbuing them with information, Stand abilities, or specific orders. He can also remove senses with discs, such as vision. After Pucci fuses with the Green Baby, Whitesnake eventually evolves into C-Moon, (Note: C-Moon (C(シー)-(・)MOON(ムーン), Shī Mūn; "See Moon" in English releases)) giving Pucci the ability to reverse the gravity of the area around him, as well as the gravity of anything the Stand touches, which can turn an object or person inside out. C-Moon eventually evolves once more into Made in Heaven, (Note: Made in Heaven (メイド・イン・ヘブン, Meido in Hebun; "Maiden Heaven" in English releases)) gaining the power to accelerate time until the universe ends, and a new universe is created. Pucci seeks to avenge Dio and continue his plans to "attain heaven" by wiping out the Joestar family and rewriting reality into Dio's image.
- The Green Baby (Note: The Green Baby (緑色の赤ちゃん, Midori-iro no Aka-chan)) is a homunculus created by Sports Maxx using a bone given to Pucci by Dio. After absorbing the souls of thirty-six prisoners, the homunculus gains a visible form and awakens. In its initial form, the Green Baby possesses a passive ability to absorb the souls of those nearby by turning them into flowers when they are hit by sunlight. After awakening, it develops the Stand Green, Green Grass of Home, (Note: Green, Green Grass of Home (グリーン・グリーン・グラス・オブ・ホーム, Gurīn Gurīn Gurasu Obu Hōmu; "Green, Green, Green Home" in English releases)) which automatically protects it by gradually shrinking any perceived threat as they move toward it, effectively preventing physical contact by invoking the dichotomy paradox.
- The Inmates of Green Dolphin Street Prison are convicted felons sentenced to maximum-security incarceration for their crimes. During Jolyne's incarceration, a number of the prisoners are recruited by Pucci to eliminate her and her allies, sometimes in exchange for favors such as recommendation for parole.
  - Gwess (Note: Gwess (グェス, Gwesu)) is Jolyne's cellmate at Green Dolphin Street Prison, serving a twelve-year sentence for arson, attempted murder, and parole violation. Her Stand, Goo Goo Dolls, (Note: Goo Goo Dolls (グーグー・ドールズ, Gūgū Dōruzu; "G.G. Dolls" in English releases)) allows her to shrink people near her. Gwess plots to use her Stand to plan her escape, forcing Jolyne to act as a scout; following her betrayal of Jolyne and subsequent defeat, she unsuccessfully attempts to regain Jolyne's trust by acting servile toward her.
  - Johngalli A. (Note: Johngalli A. (ジョンガリ・A, Jongari Ē)) is an inmate at Green Dolphin Street Prison serving an eight-year sentence for murder. He was a former soldier and a proficient sniper before becoming nearly blind due to cataracts. He is one of the last remaining followers of Dio, and plots to kill Jotaro and his daughter out of his fanatical devotion to the late vampire. He wields the Stand Manhattan Transfer, (Note: Manhattan Transfer (マンハッタン・トランスファー, Manhattan Toransufā; "Downtown Transfer" in English releases)) which acts in combination with Johngalli A.'s perception of wind currents to ricochet bullets fired from his sniper rifle.
  - Thunder McQueen (Note: Thunder McQueen (サンダー・マックイイーン, Sandā Makkuiīn)) is an inmate at Green Dolphin Street Prison serving an eight-year sentence for accidentally murdering a woman in the middle of committing suicide. Though McQueen has gained a position as a janitor and amassed a sizable fortune, he has also developed suicidal tendencies of his own; recognizing McQueen's potential for evil, Whitesnake gives him the Stand Highway to Hell, (Note: Highway to Hell (ハイウェイ・トゥ・ヘル, Haiwei Tu Heru; "Freeway Thru Hell" in English releases)) which causes its victim to share the user's self-inflicted injuries.
  - Miraschon (Note: Miraschon (ミラション, Mirashon)) is an inmate convicted for armed robbery who becomes a pawn of Enrico Pucci. She is given the Stand Marilyn Manson, the Debt Collector, (Note: Marilyn Manson, the Debt Collector (取り立て人 マリリン・マンソン, Toritatenin Maririn Manson; "Mary Lynn Manson, the Debt Collector" in English releases)) which automatically collects the debt incurred when her target loses a bet.
  - Lang Rangler (Note: Lang Rangler (ラング・ラングラー, Rangu Rangurā)) is an inmate at Green Dolphin Street Prison serving a five-year sentence for hijacking a tanker and murdering his teacher. On Pucci's orders, he battles Jolyne and Weather Report in hopes of retrieving Jotaro's Stand disc. Lang Rangler possesses the Stand Jumpin' Jack Flash, (Note: Jumpin' Jack Flash (ジャンピン・ジャック・フラッシュ, Janpin Jakku Furasshu; "Jumpin' Jack Spark" in English releases)) which can nullify the force of gravity upon anything or anyone he or his victims touch.
  - Sports Maxx (Note: Sports Maxx (スポーツ・マックス, Supōtsu Makkusu; "Sports Maximum" in English releases)) is a gangster convicted and incarcerated at Green Dolphin Street Prison for tax evasion and extortion. Many of his crimes were unable to be proven in his conviction, including his murder of Ermes' sister. As part of Pucci's plan, Sports Maxx is given the Stand Limp Bizkit, (Note: Limp Bizkit (リンプ・ビズキット, Rinpu Bizukitto; "Limp Viscuit" in English releases)) which can bring any organism back to life as an invisible zombie, including Sports Maxx himself.
  - Guccio (Note: Guccio (グッチョ, Gutcho)) is an inmate serving a five-year sentence for sexual assault and theft. He is sent to the Ultra Security House Unit by Pucci to help assassinate Jolyne and prepare for the Green Baby's birth. Whitesnake gives him the Stand Survivor, (Note: Survivor (サバイバー, Sabaibā)) a Stand that travels along wet surfaces and uses a small electrical signal to greatly increase the perception and aggression of its victims, though Guccio himself remains unaffected.
  - Kenzou (Note: Kenzou (ケンゾー, Kenzō)) is an elderly cult leader who was sentenced to Green Dolphin Street Prison for 280 years after starting his own cult and organizing a mass suicide. He is a confident martial artist and assassin who hopes to regain his former glory by gaining followers within the prison. Kenzou wields the Stand Dragon's Dream, (Note: Dragon's Dream (ドラゴンズ・ドリーム（龍の夢）, Doragonzu Dorīmu; "Drake's Dream" in English releases)) which points in the direction of lucky and unlucky areas in accordance to feng shui; the Stand acts as a neutral party, however, as its divinations are visible to both Kenzou and his opponent.
  - D an G (Note: D an G (DアンG, Dī An Jī; "D an' G" in English releases)) is an inmate in Green Dolphin Street Prison serving a twenty-year sentence for murder. D an G was a firm believer in Nostradamus's predictions; believing that the world would end in the year 2000, he shot several people he personally disliked and used his status as a police officer to cover up his crimes. As ex-police officers are often murdered in prison, he was placed in the Ultra Security House Unit for his own safety upon his conviction. He wields the automatic, sentient, and near-indestructible Stand Yo-Yo Ma, (Note: Yo-Yo Ma (ヨーヨーマッ, Yō Yō Ma; "YA-YA MA" in English releases)) which acts in a servile manner toward its target while subtly dissolving them with its acidic saliva.
- The Sons of Dio are illegitimate children of the late vampire Dio and the half-brothers of Giorno Giovanna. Assembled in a hospital in Orlando, Florida due to the influence of fate, the three are recruited by Pucci and awaken their own latent Stand abilities.
  - Ungalo (Note: Ungalo (ウンガロ, Ungaro)) is a drug addict who lost consciousness after using an unknown drug, forcing him to be brought to the hospital. He wields the Stand Bohemian Rhapsody, (Note: Bohemian Rhapsody (ボヘミアン・ラプソディー (自由人の狂想曲), Bohemian Rapusodī; "Bohemian Ecstatic" in English releases)) which allows him to summon fictional characters with the ability to swap souls with real people. Seeking revenge upon the world for his miserable life, Ungalo gladly lets his ability run wild across the world.
  - Rikiel (Note: Rikiel (リキエル, Rikieru)) is a meek and anxious man who was admitted to the hospital following a car crash. In his youth, he suffered from constant panic attacks and physical afflictions; after Pucci awakens his Stand, his afflictions are cured and he becomes more confident. Rikiel wields the Stand Sky High, (Note: Sky High (スカイ・ハイ, Sukai Hai; "Sky Guy" in English releases)) which allows him to control a colony of rod-shaped cryptids that can absorb body heat from their victims.
  - Donatello Versus (Note: Donatello Versus (ドナテロ・ヴェルサス, Donatero Verusasu)) is a man with a troubled history. After running away from home at age thirteen, he was falsely accused and convicted of stealing a pair of shoes that seemingly fell out of the sky, similarly to Stanley Yelnats in the novel Holes. These events left Versus with a deep hatred for society, and a desire to find his own happiness. After being released, a botched burglary resulted in him jumping off a six-story building, causing him to be taken to the hospital. Versus wields the Stand Under World, (Note: Under World (アンダー・ワールド, Andā Wārudo; "Netherworld" in English releases)) which allows him to unearth memories of events and people from underground, forcing his victims to relive them. Upon his defeat, he betrays Pucci by returning Weather Report's memory disc to him, only to be caught up in the ensuing chaos and killed during the battle between Pucci and Weather.
- Loccobarocco (Note: Loccobarocco (ロッコバロッコ, Rokkobarokko)) is the chief of Green Dolphin Street Prison. While speaking in public, he makes a spectacle of politely conversing with an alligator puppet named Charlotte, (Note: Charlotte (シャーロット, Shārotto)) who possesses a harsher personality.
- Viviano Westwood (Note: Viviano Westwood (ヴィヴァーノ・ウエストウッド, Vivāno Uesutouddo)) is a corrections officer in Green Dolphin Street Prison. He is sent to the Ultra Security House Unit by Pucci, where Guccio's Survivor causes him to become berserk and aggressive. Whitesnake gives him the Stand Planet Waves, (Note: Planet Waves (プラネット・ウェイブス, Puranetto Weibusu; "Starlight Waves" in English releases)) which has the ability to summon small meteors from the sky.
- Miuccia Miuller, (Note: Miuccia Miuller (ミュッチャー・ミューラー, Myutchā Myūrā)) also known as Miu Miu, is the chief guard at Green Dolphin Street Prison. Miuccia is able to prevent Stand users from escaping with her Stand Jail House Lock, (Note: Jail House Lock (ジェイル・ハウス・ロック (JAIL HOUSE LOCK), Jeiru Hausu Rokku; "Jailhouse Lock" in English releases)) which allows her to cripple her victims' memory. Through proactive and retroactive interference, Jail House Lock prevents anyone it afflicts from retaining more than three pieces of information at once, with the earliest piece of information being forgotten once another is learned.
- Dio (Note: Dio (DIO(ディオ))) makes a posthumous appearance in various flashbacks. While traveling around the world in the 1980s, Dio meets Pucci and helps him to attain his Stand. Throughout their subsequent meetings, Dio informs Pucci of his plan to achieve what he believes to be heaven. Dio eventually writes down the steps to attain heaven in a diary, but the diary is read and destroyed by Jotaro after Dio's death during the events of Stardust Crusaders. However, Pucci is able to use Whitesnake to steal Jotaro's memories of the diary and continue Dio's plan in his absence.

== Volumes ==
=== Original volumization (Jump Comics) ===
| No. | Title | Japanese release date | Japanese ISBN |
|---|---|---|---|
| 1 (64) | Prisoner FE40536–Jolyne Cujoh; Shūjin Bangō FE40536 Kūjō Jorīn (囚人番号FE40536空条徐倫) | May 1, 2000 | 978-4-08-872866-7 |
1–3. "Stone Ocean (1–3)" (石作りの海(ストーンオーシャン) その①〜③, Sutōn Ōshan Sono 1–3); 4–6. "Prisoner FE40536–Jolyne Cujoh (1–3)" (囚人番号FE40536空条徐倫 その①〜③, Shūjin Bangō FE40536 Kūjō Jorīn Sono 1–3); 7. "Goo Goo Dolls" (グーグー・ドールズ, Gūgū Dōruzu); 8. "Stone Free Appears (1)" (ストーン・フリー その①, Sutōn Furī Sono 1; lit. 'Stone Free (1)')
| 2 (65) | The Visitor to Green Dolphin Street Prison; Gurīn Dorufin Sutorīto Keimusho no Menkainin (グリーン・ドルフィン・ストリート刑務所の面会人) | August 4, 2000 | 978-4-08-872899-5 |
9. "Stone Free Appears (2)" (ストーン・フリー その②, Sutōn Furī Sono 2; lit. 'Stone Free (2)'); 10. "Green Dolphin Street Prison" (グリーン・ドルフィン・ストリート刑務所, Gurīn Dorufin Sutorīto Keimusho); 11–17. "The Visitor (1–7)" (面会人 その①〜⑦, Menkainin Sono 1–7)
| 3 (66) | Prisoner of Love; Purizunā Obu Ravu (プリズナー・オブ・ラヴ) | October 4, 2000 | 978-4-08-873027-1 |
18–19. "The Visitor (8–9)" (面会人 その⑧〜⑨, Menkainin Sono 8–9); 20. "Prisoner of Love" (プリズナー・オブ・ラヴ, Purizunā Obu Ravu); 21–25. "Ermes's Stickers (1–5)" (エルメェスのシール その①〜⑤, Erumesu no Shīru Sono 1–5); 26–27. "There's Six of Us! (1–2)" (6人いる! その①〜②, Rokunin Iru! Sono 1–2)
| 4 (67) | Go, Foo Fighters! Iku zo! Fū Faitāzu (行くぞ!フー・ファイターズ) | December 4, 2000 | 978-4-08-873051-6 |
28–30. "There's Six of Us! (3–5)" (6人いる! その③〜⑤, Rokunin Iru! Sono 3–5); 31–33. "Foo Fighters (1–3)" (フー・ファイターズ その①〜③, Fū Faitāzu Sono 1–3); 34–36. "Debt Collector Marilyn Manson (1–3)" (取り立て人マリリン・マンソン その①〜③, Toritatenin Maririn Manson Sono 1–3)
| 5 (68) | Operation Savage Garden (Head to the Courtyard!); Saveji Gāden Sakusen (Nakaniwa e Mukae!) (サヴェジ・ガーデン作戦 (中庭へ向かえ!)) | February 2, 2001 | 978-4-08-873077-6 |
37–39. "Debt Collector Marilyn Manson (4–6)" (取り立て人マリリン・マンソン その④〜⑥, Toritatenin Maririn Manson Sono 4–6); 40–45. "Operation Savage Garden (Head to the Courtyard!) (1–6)" (サヴェジ・ガーデン作戦 (中庭へ向かえ!) その①〜⑥, Saveji Gāden Sakusen (Nakaniwa e Mukae!) Sono 1–6)
| 6 (69) | Torrential Downpour Warning; Shūchū Gōu Keihō Hatsurei (集中豪雨警報発令) | April 4, 2001 | 978-4-08-873103-2 |
46–47. "Operation Savage Garden (7–8)" (サヴェジ・ガーデン作戦 その⑦〜⑧, Saveji Gāden Sakusen Sono 7–8); 48–50. "Torrential Downpour Warning (1–3)" (集中豪雨警報発令 その①〜③, Shūchū Gōu Keihō Hatsurei Sono 1–3); 51–54. "Kiss of Love and Revenge (1–4)" (愛と復讐のキッス その①〜④, Ai to Fukushū no Kissu Sono 1–4)
| 7 (70) | Ultra Security House Unit; Urutora Sekyuriti Chōbatsubō (ウルトラセキュリティ懲罰房) | June 4, 2001 | 978-4-08-873126-1 |
55–57. "Kiss of Love and Revenge (5–7)" (愛と復讐のキッス その⑤〜⑦, Ai to Fukushū no Kissu Sono 5–7); 58. "Maximum Security Disciplinary Wing" (ウルトラセキュリティ懲罰房, Urutora Sekyuriti Chōbatsubō; lit. 'Ultra Security House Unit'); 59. "His Name Is Anasui" (その名はアナスイ, Sono Na wa Anasui); 60–63. "The Secret of Guard Westwood (1–4)" (看守ウエストウッドの秘密 その①〜④, Kanshu Uesutouddo no Himitsu Sono 1–4)
| 8 (71) | Enter the Dragon's Dream; Moe yo Doragonzu Dorīmu (燃えよ竜の夢(ドラゴンズ・ドリーム)) | September 4, 2001 | 978-4-08-873160-5 |
64–66. "The Secret of Guard Westwood (5–7)" (看守ウエストウッドの秘密 その⑤〜⑦, Kanshu Uesutouddo no Himitsu Sono 5–7); 67–71. "Enter the Dragon's Dream (1–5)" (燃えよ竜の夢(ドラゴンズ・ドリーム) その①〜⑤, Moe yo Doragonzu Dorīmu Sono 1–5); 72. "Enter the Foo Fighters" (燃えよフー・ファイターズ, Moe yo Fū Faitāzu)
| 9 (72) | Birth of the Green; Midori-iro no Tanjō (緑色の誕生) | November 2, 2001 | 978-4-08-873183-4 |
73–74. "Enter the Dragon's Dream (6–7)" (燃えよ竜の夢(ドラゴンズ・ドリーム) その⑥〜⑦, Moe yo Doragonzu Dorīmu Sono 6–7); 75. "Jotaro and Jolyne, Father and Daughter" (父・空条承太郎 娘・空条徐倫, Chichi: Kūjō Jōtarō Musume: Kūjō Jorīn; lit. 'Father: Jotaro Kujo, Daughter: Jolyne Cujoh'); 76–77. "Birth of the 'Green' (1–2)" (『緑色』の誕生 その①〜②, "Midori-iro" no Tanjō Sono 1–2); 78–81. "Yo-Yo Ma Is Coming! (1–4)" (ヨーヨーマッが来る! その①〜④, Yōyōma ga Kuru! Sono 1–4)
| 10 (73) | Awaken; Aweikun - Mezame (AWAKEN(アウェイクン)-目覚め) | February 4, 2002 | 978-4-08-873225-1 |
82. "Yo-Yo Ma Is Coming! (5)" (ヨーヨーマッが来る! その⑤, Yōyōma ga Kuru! Sono 5); 83–84. "F.F.–The Witness (1–2)" (F(エフ)・F(エフ)-目撃者 その①〜②, Efu Efu - Mokugekisha Sono 1–2); 85–88. "Awaken (1–4)" (AWAKEN(アウェイクン)-目覚め その①〜④, Aweikun - Mezame Sono 1–4); 89–90. "Whitesnake–The Hunter (1–2)" (ホワイトスネイク-追跡者 その①〜②, Howaitosuneiku - Tsuisekisha Sono 1–2; lit. 'Whitesnake–The Pursuer (1-2)')
| 11 (74) | Head Out! Time for Heaven; Mukae! Tengoku no Toki (向かえ! 天国の時) | April 4, 2002 | 978-4-08-873250-3 |
91–93. "Whitesnake–The Hunter (3–5)" (ホワイトスネイク-追跡者 その③〜⑤, Howaitosuneiku - Tsuisekisha Sono 3–5; lit. 'Whitesnake–The Pursuer (3-5)'); 94. "Time for Heaven" (天国の時, Tengoku no Toki); 95. "New Moon! New Priest" (新月の時!新(ニュー)神父, Shingetsu no Toki! Nyū Shinpu); 96–99. "Jail House Lock! (1–4)" (JAIL(ジェイル) HOUSE(ハウス) LOCK(ロック)! その①〜④, Jeiru Hausu Rokku! Sono 1–4)
| 12 (75) | Jailbreak... Datsugoku e... (脱獄へ…) | July 4, 2002 | 978-4-08-873284-8 |
100–101. "Jail House Lock! (5–6)" (JAIL(ジェイル) HOUSE(ハウス) LOCK(ロック)! その⑤〜⑥, Jeiru Hausu Rokku Sono 5–6); 102. "Jailbreak..." (脱獄へ…, Datsugoku e...); 103. "The Three Men Who Were Taken to the Hospital" (病院に運ばれた3人の男, Byōin ni Hakobareta Sannin no Otoko); 104–108. "Bohemian Rhapsody (1–5)" (自由人の狂想曲(ボヘミアン・ラプソディー) その①〜⑤, Bohemian Rapusodī Sono 1–5)
| 13 (76) | Sky-High Sky High! Sora Takaku Sukai Hai! (空高くスカイ・ハイ!) | September 4, 2002 | 978-4-08-873315-9 |
109–110. "Bohemian Rhapsody (6–7)" (自由人の狂想曲(ボヘミアン・ラプソディー) その⑥〜⑦, Bohemian Rapusodī Sono 6–7); 111. "It's Been a While, Romeo" (ひさしぶりねロメオ, Hisashiburi ne Romeo); 112–117. "Sky High (1–6)" (スカイ・ハイ その①〜⑥, Sukai Hai Sono 1–6)
| 14 (77) | Time for Heaven: Three Days Until the New Moon; Tengoku no Toki Shingetsu made Ato Mikka (天国の時 新月まであと3日) | December 4, 2002 | 978-4-08-873346-3 |
118. "Heaven is at Hand: Three Days Until the New Moon" (天国の時 新月まであと3日, Tengoku no Toki Shingetsu made Ato Mikka; lit. 'Time for Heaven: Three Days Until the New Moon'); 119–124. "Under World (1–6)" (アンダー・ワールド その①〜⑥, Andā Wārudo Sono 1–6); 125–126. "Heavy Weather (1–2)" (ヘビー・ウェザー その①〜②, Hebī Wezā Sono 1–2)
| 15 (78) | Heavy Weather; Hebī Wezā (ヘビー・ウェザー) | February 4, 2003 | 978-4-08-873383-8 |
127–135. "Heavy Weather (3–11)" (ヘビー・ウェザー その③〜⑪, Hebī Wezā Sono 3–11)
| 16 (79) | At Cape Canaveral; Kēpu Kanaberaru nite (ケープ・カナベラルにて) | April 4, 2003 | 978-4-08-873410-1 |
136–137. "Heavy Weather (12–13)" (ヘビー・ウェザー その⑫〜⑬, Hebī Wezā Sono 12–13); 138. "At Cape Canaveral" (ケープ・カナベラルにて, Kēpu Kanaberaru nite); 139–140. "Gravity of the New Moon (1–2)" (新月の重力 その①〜②, Shingetsu no Jūryoku Sono 1–2); 141–146. "C-Moon (1–6)" (C(シー)-(・)MOON(ムーン) その①〜⑥, Shī Mūn Sono 1–6)
| 17 (80) | Made in Heaven; Meido In Hebun (メイド・イン・ヘブン) | July 4, 2003 | 978-4-08-873483-5 |
147–148. "C-Moon (7–8)" (C(シー)-(・)MOON(ムーン) その⑦〜⑧, Shī Mūn Sono 7–8); 149–157. "Made in Heaven (1–9)" (メイド・イン・ヘブン その①〜⑨, Meido In Hebun Sono 1–9); 158. "What a Wonderful World" (ホワット・ア・ワンダフル・ワールド, Howatto a Wandafuru Wārudo)

=== 2008 release (Shueisha Bunko) ===
| No. | Title | Japanese release date | Japanese ISBN |
|---|---|---|---|
| 40 | Part 6: Stone Ocean 1 Part 6 Sutōn Ōshan 1 (Part6 ストーンオーシャン 1) | April 18, 2008 | 978-4-08-618736-7 |
Chapters 1–13
| 41 | Part 6: Stone Ocean 2 Part 6 Sutōn Ōshan 2 (Part6 ストーンオーシャン 2) | May 16, 2008 | 978-4-08-618737-4 |
Chapters 14–28
| 42 | Part 6: Stone Ocean 3 Part 6 Sutōn Ōshan 3 (Part6 ストーンオーシャン 3) | June 18, 2008 | 978-4-08-618738-1 |
Chapters 29–43
| 43 | Part 6: Stone Ocean 4 Part 6 Sutōn Ōshan 4 (Part6 ストーンオーシャン 4) | July 18, 2008 | 978-4-08-618739-8 |
Chapters 44–57
| 44 | Part 6: Stone Ocean 5 Part 6 Sutōn Ōshan 5 (Part6 ストーンオーシャン 5) | August 8, 2008 | 978-4-08-618740-4 |
Chapters 58–72
| 45 | Part 6: Stone Ocean 6 Part 6 Sutōn Ōshan 6 (Part6 ストーンオーシャン 6) | September 18, 2008 | 978-4-08-618741-1 |
Chapters 73–86
| 46 | Part 6: Stone Ocean 7 Part 6 Sutōn Ōshan 7 (Part6 ストーンオーシャン 7) | October 17, 2008 | 978-4-08-618742-8 |
Chapters 87–101
| 47 | Part 6: Stone Ocean 8 Part 6 Sutōn Ōshan 8 (Part6 ストーンオーシャン 8) | November 18, 2008 | 978-4-08-618743-5 |
Chapters 102–115
| 48 | Part 6: Stone Ocean 9 Part 6 Sutōn Ōshan 9 (Part6 ストーンオーシャン 9) | December 12, 2008 | 978-4-08-618744-2 |
Chapters 116–129
| 49 | Part 6: Stone Ocean 10; Part 6 Sutōn Ōshan 10 (Part6 ストーンオーシャン 10) | January 16, 2009 | 978-4-08-618745-9 |
Chapters 130–144
| 50 | Part 6: Stone Ocean 11; Part 6 Sutōn Ōshan 11 (Part6 ストーンオーシャン 11) | February 18, 2009 | 978-4-08-618746-6 |
Chapters 145–158

=== English release ===
| No. | English release date | English ISBN |
|---|---|---|
| 1 (36) (Note: Continuing from the English JoJonium releases of Parts 1–3 and the hardcover releases of Parts 4 and 5.) | November 28, 2023 | 978-1-9747-3266-1 |
Chapters 1–17
| 2 (37) | January 23, 2024 | 978-1-9747-4288-2 |
Chapters 18–36
| 3 (38) | March 26, 2024 | 978-1-9747-4322-3 |
Chapters 37–54
| 4 (39) | May 28, 2024 | 978-1-9747-4561-6 |
Chapters 55–72
| 5 (40) | July 23, 2024 | 978-1-9747-4608-8 |
Chapters 73–90
| 6 (41) | September 24, 2024 | 978-1-9747-4880-8 |
Chapters 91–108
| 7 (42) | November 26, 2024 | 978-1-9747-4930-0 |
Chapters 109–126
| 8 (43) | January 28, 2025 | 978-1-9747-5149-5 |
Chapters 127–142
| 9 (44) | March 25, 2025 | 978-1-9747-5218-8 |
Chapters 143–158

== Related media ==
=== Anime ===
The anime adaptation of Stone Ocean was personally announced by series creator Hirohiko Araki on the "JoJo's Bizarre Adventure the Animation Special Event: JOESTAR Inherited Soul" live stream in April 2021. The first twelve episodes premiered on Netflix worldwide on December 1, 2021; episodes 13–24 were released on September 1, 2022, and episodes 25–38 were released on December 1, 2022.

=== One-shot manga ===
Fujiko no Kimyō na Shoseijutsu: Whitesnake no Gosan (フジコの奇妙な処世術 -ホワイトスネイクの誤算-; "Fujiko's Bizarre Wisdom: Whitesnake's Miscalculation"), a one-shot spin-off manga by Shō Aimoto, the creator of Kemono Jihen, was published by Shueisha in their seinen manga magazine Ultra Jump on December 18, 2021.

== Reception ==
Kono Manga ga Sugoi! recommended the series, and called Jolyne a distinctive character within the JoJo's Bizarre Adventure franchise. In a 2015 poll on Charapedia, Japanese readers ranked Stone Ocean as having the seventeenth most shocking ending of all time in manga and anime.
