= Yero (disambiguation) =

Yero may refer to:

- Yero, a name, in multiple cultures and languages, used as a surname and given name
- Vicia ervilia, a Mediterranean grain legume crop also called 'yero'
- Gyro (food) also spelled as "yero" and "yeros"
- Year End Roll Over (YERO), a type of integer overflow or counter reset in data systems and calendrical systems

== See also ==
- Dimitris Yeros (born 1948) Greek artist
- Giro (disambiguation)
- Gyro (disambiguation)
