= Gero (disambiguation) =

Gero may refer to:

== People ==
- Gero (singer), Japanese singer
- Gero I (ca. 900–965), medieval margrave of the Holy Roman Empire
- Gero, Count of Alsleben (died 979)
- Gero II (ca. 975–1015), medieval margrave of the Holy Roman Empire
- Gero, Archbishop of Cologne (900–976)
- Gero, Archbishop of Magdeburg (died 1023)
- Gero Miesenböck, a Waynflete Professor of Physiology at the University of Oxford and a fellow of Magdalen College.
- Gero Hütter, German hematologist
- Ernő Gerő (1898–1980), Hungarian politician
- Joan Gero (1944–2016), an American archaeologist and pioneer of feminist archaeology
- Martin Gero (born 1977), a Canadian screenwriter, producer, and director

=== Fictional characters ===
- Doctor Gero, a character in the Dragon Ball media

== Other uses ==
- Eastern Region Army Group (GERO) in Spain
- Gero, Gifu, a city in Japan
- The Gerogerigegege, a Japanese music project
- Gero (book) ("Later"), a 1643 Basque-language book by Pedro Agerre.
- Dr. Gero Cup, a football tournament

== See also ==
- Garo (disambiguation)
- Giro (disambiguation)
- Gyro (disambiguation)
- Jero
- Jiro (disambiguation)
