= Gyro =

Gyro may refer to:

== Science and technology ==
- GYRO, a computer program for tokamak plasma simulation
- Gyro Motor Company, an American aircraft engine manufacturer
- Gyrodactylus salaris, a parasite in salmon
- Gyroscope, an orientation-stabilizing device
- Autogyro, a type of rotary-wing aircraft
- Honda Gyro, a family of tilting three wheel vehicles
- The casually used brand name of a detangler mechanism, part of a stunt-adapted BMX bicycle
- Gyro (spider), a genus of spiders in the family Theridiidae

== Fictional characters ==
- Gyro Gearloose, a comic book character from Disney's Duck universe
- Gyro Zeppeli, one of the main characters of the manga Steel Ball Run

== Other uses ==
- Gyro (magazine), student magazine of Otago Polytechnic, New Zealand
- Gyro International, a social fraternal organization
- Gyroball, a Japanese baseball pitch
- Gyro, or gyros, a greek pita wrap or the rotisserie cooked meat it contains

== See also ==
- Giro (disambiguation)
