= JoJolion =

Eighth story arc of JoJo's Bizarre Adventure

- First tankōbon volume cover, featuring Josuke Higashikata and his Stand, Soft & Wet

ジョジョリオン (Jojorion)
- Manga
- Written by: Hirohiko Araki
- Published by: Shueisha
- English publisher: NA: Viz Media
- Imprint: Jump Comics
- Magazine: Ultra Jump
- Original run: May 19, 2011 – August 19, 2021
- Volumes: 27
- Chronology
- Preceded by: Steel Ball Run; Followed by: The JoJoLands
- icon

JoJolion (Japanese: ジョジョリオン, Hepburn: Jojorion) is the eighth main story arc of the Japanese manga series JoJo's Bizarre Adventure, written and illustrated by Hirohiko Araki. Set in Japan in 2011, it follows Josuke Higashikata, a young man afflicted by retrograde amnesia, in his search to uncover his identity in Morioh Town, a coastal Japanese town affected by the Tōhoku earthquake and tsunami. However, his digging pulls him and his adoptive family into the unfinished business between his previous life and an impending inhuman threat. It was serialized by Shueisha in the seinen manga magazine Ultra Jump from May 2011 until August 2021, and has been collected in 27 tankōbon volumes. Viz Media has licensed the manga for an English release in North America, with the first volume set to release in Q3 2027.

== Plot ==
Following the 2011 Tōhoku earthquake and tsunami, (Note: The universe in which Steel Ball Run and onward take place is not related to the first six parts in any way beyond references to the names of its characters and a scant few returning Stands.) anomalous formations known as the Wall Eyes emerge near the coastal town of Morioh. These structures possess the ability to exchange traits between objects buried within their vicinity and occasionally awaken Stand abilities in individuals. Yasuho Hirose, a local college student, discovers an amnesiac young man buried beneath the Wall Eyes and temporarily names him "Josuke". Together, they endeavor to uncover his lost memories and true identity. While Yasuho investigates possible connections between Josuke and a missing ship doctor named Yoshikage Kira, she entrusts his care to the Higashikata family. Upon visiting Kira's ailing mother, Holy Joestar-Kira, Yasuho gathers clues that eventually lead Josuke to realize he is a fusion of Kira and another individual.

Josuke confronts Norisuke Higashikata IV, the family patriarch, regarding his motives for sheltering him. Norisuke reveals that the Higashikata lineage suffers from a generational curse that petrifies their firstborn children, and they require Kira's memories to break it. Kira had been involved with a miraculous fruit called the Locacaca, capable of healing one part of the body at the expense of another. Unbeknownst to Norisuke, his eldest son Jobin has been secretly trafficking Locacaca in collaboration with a group of stone-based beings known as Rock Humans, who seek to eliminate Josuke and infiltrate human society.

Further revelations expose that before Josuke's awakening, Kira and a man named Josefumi Kujo had grafted a Locacaca branch onto a tree in the Higashikata orchard, creating a new variant of the fruit that uses another person as collateral for healing. After Kira was mortally wounded by the Rock Humans, Josefumi used this new Locacaca to save him, and the two were buried beneath what would later become the Wall Eyes. Recognizing himself as the fusion of Josefumi and Kira, Josuke resolves to retrieve the new Locacaca and fulfill their original intent: curing Holy. Meanwhile, Jobin's mother, Kaato, is released from prison after serving a 15-year sentence for murdering a child to save Jobin's life. Though Jobin reunites with her, he conceals his plan to use the Locacaca branch to heal his son, Tsurugi.

Under Norisuke's direction, Josuke enlists the help of Rai Mamezuku, a plant appraiser, to locate the Locacaca branch in the Higashikata orchard. However, Jobin's alliance with the Rock Humans collapses, prompting him to set the orchard ablaze to prevent both Josuke and his former allies from securing the branch. Amid the chaos, two Rock Humans posing as paramedics seize what they believe to be the Locacaca branch, unaware that Tsurugi has deceived them—and Josuke's group—using his Stand. The true branch remains in Jobin's possession. After defeating one of the Rock Humans, Josuke and his allies prepare to pursue the hospital director suspected of orchestrating the conflict.

Their investigation leads them to Toru, a hospital intern who directs them toward the elusive director, Satoru Akefu. During their pursuit, Akefu's Stand manipulates natural laws to assault them, forcing the group to separate. Josuke lures Akefu into a confrontation alongside Mamezuku, while Yasuho inadvertently exposes the Locacaca branch's location to the Higashikata family. Norisuke confronts Jobin, only to be incapacitated; moments later, Jobin falls victim to a calamitous force as Toru arrives. Yasuho deduces that Toru is the true Stand User behind Wonder of U, the ability controlling calamity, and that he has been masquerading as Akefu.

Mamezuku and Josuke attempt to ambush Akefu, but Mamezuku is mortally wounded in the process. Before dying, he awakens the latent Spin within Josuke's Stand ability. Yasuho relays her discoveries to Josuke, who then combines his power with hers and the Spin to launch a decisive attack against Toru. Though Akefu evades destruction, Toru is gravely injured and consumes a ripening Locacaca fruit in a desperate bid to initiate an exchange. Kaato intervenes, forcing Toru to bear Tsurugi's curse in his place, resulting in both their deaths. The last remnants of the new Locacaca branch are destroyed in the struggle.

With the conflict resolved, Josuke and Yasuho visit Holy in the hospital. While Yasuho catches sight of Josefumi's mother outside, Josuke chooses not to approach her, having embraced his identity as neither Josefumi nor Kira. The two later join the surviving Higashikata family at a cake shop, where they deliberate over a celebratory dessert for Norisuke's impending hospital discharge. The family ultimately defers the decision to Josuke as Yasuho departs, content in the knowledge that he has found both a home and a new purpose.

== Characters ==
- Josuke Higashikata (Note: Josuke Higashikata (東方 定助, Higashikata Jōsuke)) is a young man with no memory of his past or name. He is temporarily named "Josuke" by Yasuho after her dog. He later learns that he was originally Josefumi Kujo, (Note: Josefumi Kujo (空条 仗世文, Kūjō Josefumi)) a friend of the Kira Family whose body was fused with Yoshikage Kira's by the land later marked by the Wall Eyes and a new form of Locacaca fruit. He uses the Stand Soft & Wet, (Note: Soft & Wet (ソフト&ウェット（柔らかくてそして濡れている）, Sofuto Ando Wetto (Yawarakakute Soshite Nureteiru))) which allows him to produce soap bubbles that absorb an aspect of whatever object they touch, such as a person's eyesight or the friction of a floor. He later discovers another ability of his Stand he dubs Soft & Wet: Go Beyond, (Note: Soft & Wet: Go Beyond (Soft & Wet: Go Beyond(ソフト＆ウェット・ゴー・ビヨンド), Sofuto Ando Wetto Gō Biyondo)) allowing him to shoot bubbles imbued with an explosive and transcendent form of the Spin phenomenon from Steel Ball Run.
- Yasuho Hirose (Note: Yasuho Hirose (広瀬 康穂, Hirose Yasuho)) is a young woman who discovers Josuke and helps him search for his true identity. She uses the Stand Paisley Park, (Note: Paisley Park (ペイズリーパーク, Peizurī Pāku)) which has the ability to direct things around Yasuho and send objects through wireless connections.
- Rai Mamezuku (Note: Rai Mamezuku (豆銑 礼, Mamezuku Rai)) is a plant appraiser and fruit grower who works for the Higashikata fruit company. Norisuke asks him to assist Josuke in searching for, grafting, and harvesting a new type of Locacaca fruit. He uses the Stand Doggy Style, (Note: Doggy Style (ドギー・スタイル, Dogī Sutairu)) which allows him to peel his flesh like an apple, turning it into a ribbon that he can manipulate.
- The Higashikata Family (Note: Higashikata Family (東方家, Higashikata-ke)) are the descendants of Norisuke Higashikata from Steel Ball Run. They suffer from an ancient curse that causes their firstborn child of every generation to turn into stone and die at a young age. The current members of the family live in Morioh and operate a financially-successful fruit company started by their famous ancestor.
  - Norisuke Higashikata IV (Note: Norisuke Higashikata IV (四代目東方 憲助, Yondaime Higashikata Norisuke)) is the patriarch of the Higashikata family and the manager of his company's primary fruit parlor. Norisuke hopes to break his family's curse using Kira's knowledge of the mysterious Locacaca fruit, but insists upon following a righteous path toward his goals. He uses the Stand King Nothing, (Note: King Nothing (キング・ナッシング, Kingu Nasshingu)) which has the ability to track by scent while changing its physical appearance to resemble the target it is tracking.
  - Joshu Higashikata (Note: Joshu Higashikata (東方 常秀, Higashikata Jōshū)) is a college student with an unrequited love for Yasuho. He uses the Stand Nut King Call, (Note: Nut King Call (ナット・キング・コール, Natto Kingu Kōru)) which allows him to materialize nuts and bolts through objects or people's bodies; that can be used to either detach objects or limbs from each other, or attach objects together.
  - Daiya Higashikata (Note: Daiya Higashikata (東方 大弥, Higashikata Daiya)) is a near-blind teenage girl and the youngest daughter of the Higashikata family. She uses the Stand California King Bed, (Note: California King Bed (カリフォルニア・キング・ベッドちゃん, Kariforunia Kingu Beddo-chan)) which allows her to steal people's memories and store them within chess pieces if they break one of her rules. When Josuke temporarily moves into her family's house, Daiya instantly falls in love with him and plots to manipulate him into returning her feelings.
  - Hato Higashikata (Note: Hato Higashikata (東方 鳩, Higashikata Hato)) is a fashion model and the eldest daughter of the Higashikata family. She uses the Stand Walking Heart, (Note: Walking Heart (ウォーキング・ハート, Wōkingu Hāto)) which allows her to extend her shoes' heels into spikes to walk up walls and impale enemies.
  - Jobin Higashikata (Note: Jobin Higashikata (東方 常敏, Higashikata Jōbin)) is the eldest son of the Higashikata family. Jobin officially works in foreign research for the Higashikata fruit company, but secretly uses his position to launder money and Locacaca fruits for the Locacaca Smuggling Organization. Upon learning of the new Locacaca variant, he secretly plots to use the fruit to cure his son Tsurugi by any means necessary. Jobin uses the Stand Speed King, (Note: Speed King (スピード・キング, Supīdo Kingu)) which allows him to manipulate the temperature of his targets and store heat in objects which can then be released as a trap.
  - Mitsuba Higashikata (Note: Mitsuba Higashikata (東方 密葉, Higashikata Mitsuba)) is Jobin's vain wife and a model working for the Higashikata fruit company's advertising division. She uses the Stand Awaking III Leaves, (Note: Awaking III Leaves (アウェイキング・IIIリーブス, Aweikingu Surī Rībusu)) which allows her to create vector arrows that will repel anything from the arrow's direction.
  - Tsurugi Higashikata (Note: Tsurugi Higashikata (東方 つるぎ, Higashikata Tsurugi)) is Jobin and Mitsuba's son, an eleven-year-old boy who dresses as a girl to avoid the evil eye, in line with family tradition. Tsurugi fears his family's curse, allowing him to be manipulated by Yotsuyu after seeing him cure a petrified dog named Iwasuke. (Note: Iwasuke (岩助)) Tsurugi uses the Stand Paper Moon King, (Note: Paper Moon King (ペーパー・ムーン・キング, Pēpā Mūn Kingu)) which lets him create origami that disrupts the perception of anyone who touches it, and additionally allows him to create origami from other objects besides paper and control any origami creatures he has made.
  - Kaato Higashikata (Note: Kaato Higashikata (東方 花都, Higashikata Kaato)) is Norisuke's ex-wife and the mother of Hato, Joshu, Daiya and Jobin. After Jobin accidentally incapacitated a child with his Stand at a young age, Kaato used the opportunity to save Jobin from the family curse, killing the other youth. She is released from Stone Ocean Jail after serving a fifteen-year sentence, with plans to take her share of the family's fortune. She uses the Stand Space Trucking, (Note: Space Trucking (スペース・トラッキング, Supēsu Torakkingu)) which lets her store objects or people between playing cards.
- Kei Nijimura (Note: Kei Nijimura (虹村 京, Nijimura Kei)) is the Higashikata family's maid, and is later revealed to be Holy's daughter and Yoshikage Kira's younger sister. She took on a fake last name and evidence of her existence was erased by Kira to infiltrate the Higashikata family. Initially suspicious of Josuke, Nijimura comes to sympathize with the amnesiac and provides him with a clue about his true identity. She uses the Stand Born This Way, (Note: Born This Way (ボーン・ディス・ウェイ, Bōn Disu Wei), originally named Going Underground (ゴーイング・アンダーグラウンド, Gōingu Andāguraundo)) which appears when its target opens an item, such as a door or a notebook, and attacks by freezing everything around it.
- Holy Joestar-Kira (Note: Holy Joestar-Kira (吉良・ホリー・ジョースター, Kira Horī Jōsutā)) is an ophthalmologist from T.H. Medical University Hospital and an associate professor at Morioh's T.G. University. She is hospitalized due to a condition that destroyed parts of her brain and other organs. It is later revealed that she was experimented upon by the Rock Humans in order to create new forms of medicine from the Locacaca fruit. She is the great-granddaughter of Johnny Joestar.
- Yoshikage Kira (Note: Yoshikage Kira (吉良 吉影, Kira Yoshikage)) is a doctor who is a descendant of Johnny Joestar through his mother Holy. He was friends with Josefumi Kujo, who attempted to help him save Holy's life by stealing a Locacaca branch to use its fruit. After Yoshikage was fatally wounded by the Rock Humans, a combination of the new Locacaca's effects and the emerging Wall Eyes caused his body to swap traits with Josefumi's, creating Josuke. Yoshikage's Stand is Killer Queen, (Note: Killer Queen (キラークイーン, Kirā Kuīn)) which can producing exploding pockets of air and summon multiple tank-like stands called Sheer Heart Attack. (Note: Sheer Heart Attack (シアーハートアタック, Shiā Hāto Atakku))
- Rock Humans are a mysterious race of humanoid silicon-based lifeforms with the ability to turn into stone, having infiltrated Morioh under assumed aliases. The two groups active in Morioh have ties to both the Locacaca fruit and Jobin, and intend to silence anyone who learns of the former's existence. Josuke comes into conflict with these groups, which include the following members:
  - Toru (Note: Toru (透龍, Tōru)) is the main antagonist of JoJolion. He is a part-time hospital worker and Yasuho's ex-boyfriend from high school. He is later revealed to be the leader of the Rock Humans and the Locacaca research organization, seeking to obtain the new Locacaca fruit and use its medicinal value to rise to the apex of society. Toru's Stand is Wonder of U, (Note: Wonder of U (ワンダー・オブ・U (ユー), Wandā Obu Yū)) which causes anyone who attempts to pursue him or his Stand to suffer freak accidents referred to as "calamities". The Stand itself assumes a human form known as Satoru Akefu, (Note: Satoru Akefu (明負 悟, Akefu Satoru)) posing as the director of operations at T.G. University Hospital.
  - The Locacaca Smuggling Organization is a mysterious, secret smuggling operation that serve as the first group of antagonists Josuke must face. Their only goal is to smuggle Locacaca fruits into Japan and sell them at an immense profit.
    - Yotsuyu Yagiyama (Note: Yotsuyu Yagiyama (八木山 夜露, Yagiyama Yotsuyu)) is the first Rock Human to be introduced. He tricks Tsurugi into helping him kill Josuke, while also plotting to steal the Higashikata fortune. Yotsuyu's assumed public identity is that of an architect of some regard, the man responsible for designing and building the Higashikata family's house. Yotsuyu's Stand is I Am a Rock, (Note: I Am a Rock (アイ・アム・ア・ロック, Ai Amu A Rokku)) which turns his target into a gravity well that pulls certain objects towards them.
    - Aisho Dainenjiyama (Note: Aisho Dainenjiyama (大年寺山 愛唱, Dainenjiyama Aishō)) is a Rock Human who works as a security guard at Morioh's baseball stadium. Due to being betrayed by a former girlfriend in the past, he is constantly nervous and paranoid. He attacks Yasuho and Tsurugi when he realizes they are following him, forcing the latter to trick him into getting run over by a bus. Aisho's Stand is Doobie Wah!, (Note: Doobie Wah! (ドゥービー・ワゥ！, Dūbī Wau!)) which allows him to create small razor-sharp tornadoes that automatically track down their target using their breathing.
    - The A. Phex Brothers (Note: A. Phex Brothers (エイ・フェックス兄弟, Ei Fekkusu-kyōdai)) are twin Rock Humans who pose as street performers. Having played a role in the attempt on Josefumi and Yoshikage's lives, they target Karera before coming across Josuke. The older brother's Stand, Schott Key No. 1, (Note: Schott Key No. 1 (ショット・キー No.1, Shotto Kī Nanbā Wan)) allows him to transfer objects between his two hands; he uses it in combination with his younger brother's Stand, Schott Key No. 2, (Note: Schott Key No. 2 (ショット・キー No.2, Shotto Kī Nanbā Tsū)) a soccer ball containing a poisonous gas.
    - Tamaki Damo (Note: Tamaki Damo (田最 環, Damo Tamaki)) is a Rock Human and the leader of the Locacaca Smuggling Organization. He pretends to fall in love with Hato to infiltrate the Higashikata estate and track down his allies' killers, only to be mortally wounded by Hato and finished off by Josuke. Damo's Stand is Vitamin C, (Note: Vitamin C (ビタミンC Bitamin Shī)) which allows him to render a living being's body malleable or completely liquefy them after they touch an object that has his fingerprints on it.
  - The Locacaca Research Organization is a group working in the medical field. Their interest in the Locacaca fruit stems from a desire to make Rock Humans the dominant species through medicinal breakthroughs.
    - Urban Guerrilla, (Note: Urban Guerrilla (アーバン・ゲリラ, Āban Gerira)) formally known as Ryo Shimosato, (Note: Ryo Shimosato (下里 良, Shimosato Ryō)) is a gastroenterologist who is sent to kill Mamezuku before Josuke and Yasuho can meet him. He attacks the three of them alongside his pet Rock Animal Doremifasolati Do. (Note: Doremifasolatido Do (ドレミファソラティ・ド, Doremifasorati Do)) Guerrilla's Stand is Brain Storm, (Note: Brain Storm (ブレイン・ストーム, Burein Sutōmu)) which can cause hemolysis and melt the flesh of anyone that comes in contact with his spores.
    - Poor Tom (Note: Poor Tom (プアー・トム, Puā Tomu)) is a short, infant-like Rock Human with the face and personality of a grown man. He tells Jobin to bury his Stand in his family orchard to prevent Mamezuku from finding the branch, only to betray him and his son Tsurugi once he does. His Stand, Ozon Baby, (Note: Ozon Baby (オゾン・ベイビー, Ozon Beibī)) pressurizes all enclosed spaces within its radius upon activation, rapidly inflicting depressurization sickness on those who exit the space. Ozon Baby can also create illusions of itself that have no effect.
    - Wu Tomoki (Note: Wu Tomoki (羽 伴毅, Ū Tomoki)) is a Rock Human who poses as an orthopedic surgeon and Mitsuba's doctor. He attacks Yasuho when she threatens his treatment of Mitsuba, and through it his connection to the Higashikata family. He reveals Holy's research into the Locacaca fruit, but is killed when Josuke seals his fragmented head in medical cement. He uses the Stand Doctor Wu, (Note: Doctor Wu (ドクター・ウー, Dokutā Ū)) which allows him to disintegrate into small independent stone fragments in order to manipulate and possess living beings.
  - Dolomite, (Note: Dolomite (ドロミテ, Doromite)) formally known as Masaji Dorokoma, (Note: Masaji Dorokoma (泥駒 政次, Dorokoma Masaji)) is the only Rock Human not affiliated with either of the groups above. He was once a carefree, handsome man until he saved his blind girlfriend from entering a power plant, burning his body and destroying his arms and legs in the process. Jobin contacts him and asks him to take out Josuke after Damo's death. Dolomite uses the Stand Blue Hawaii, (Note: Blue Hawaii (ブルー・ハワイ, Burū Hawai)) which can possess anyone who touches something that belongs to the user, including its previous victims. Any possessed victims will walk toward a specific target, albeit in a straight, linear direction and without perception of any obstacles.
- Ojiro Sasame (Note: Ojiro Sasame (笹目 桜二郎, Sasame Ōjirō)) is a surfer and small-time criminal who enjoys tormenting innocent women. His vile personality earned the ire of Yoshikage Kira, who eventually manipulated him into cutting all ten of his fingers off. Ojiro planned to kill Kira and frame him for kidnapping in revenge, but is instead defeated and interrogated by Josuke and Yasuho. Later, he attempts to steal the new Locacaca fruit for himself, only to be killed by Jobin and Tsurugi. He uses the Stand Fun Fun Fun, (Note: Fun Fun Fun (ファン・ファン・ファン, Fan Fan Fan)) which can forcibly take control of the wounded limbs of anyone directly beneath him.
- Karera Sakunami (Note: Karera Sakunami (作並 カレラ, Sakunami Karera)) is a college student with an unrequited crush on Josefumi Kujo. She is a crude and volatile extortionist who pays no mind to her past or future. Being a witness to Kira and Josefumi's deaths, she is pursued by the A. Phex Brothers and eventually aids Josuke in defeating the duo. She uses the Stand Love Love Deluxe, (Note: Love Love Deluxe (ラブラブデラックス, Rabu Rabu Derakkusu)) which can freely manipulate other people's hair.
- Joseph Joestar, (Note: Joseph Joestar (仗世文(ジョセフ)・ジョースター, Josefu Jōsutā)) commonly referred to by the nickname Fumi, (Note: Fumi (文, Fumi)) is the grandson of Johnny Joestar from Steel Ball Run. In 1941, he meets an elderly Lucy Steel and accompanies her on her mission to investigate the Higashikata Fruit Company, only for the two of them to be attacked by a living guard rail. After saving Lucy and himself with his Stand, he travels to America out of concern for Lucy's health, but finds himself stranded in the country by the outbreak of World War II. He is the father of Holy Joestar-Kira, and two of his grandchildren from another daughter are featured in The JoJoLands.
- Shakedown Road (Note: Shakedown Road (カツアゲロード, Katsuage Rōdo)) is a location in Morioh where the residents are known for extorting visitors. The trees that line the road possess a Stand named Les Feuilles (Note: Les Feuilles (オータム・リーブス, Ōtamu Rībusu; lit. Autumn Leaves)) that can instantly transport anyone or anything along the paths created by their fallen leaves. A legend from 1901 recounts how Johnny Joestar brought the Holy Corpse to Morioh to cure his wife's mysterious illness, incidentally creating the Stand.
- Milagroman (Note: Milagroman (ミラグロマン, Miraguroman)) is the Stand of a well-known unnamed arms dealer who set his family, fortune, house and himself on fire after losing a 50-billion-dollar lawsuit. The Stand causes whoever destroys part of its previous owner's money to gain increasingly-large amounts of money until they are buried alive, regardless of their attempts to spend it. The only way to escape the Stand's ability is to either return the curse to its previous owner or pass it on to a new one.

== Production ==
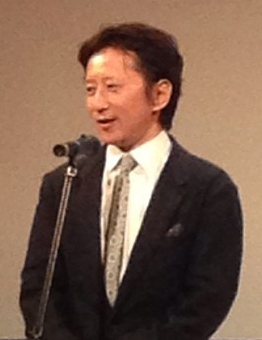
The series is created by Hirohiko Araki.

JoJolion is written and illustrated by Hirohiko Araki. It premiered in Shueisha's Ultra Jump on May 19, 2011, and ended on August 19, 2021, making it the longest running part of the JoJo's Bizarre Adventure series overall. In the first volume, Araki described the story of JoJolion as being the solving of a "curse" (呪い, noroi). Curses, he goes on, are the sins of the ancestors and this makes people "unclean" (穢れ, kegare), and if this curse continues it will only turn into "resentment" (恨み, urami). Another theme is that from birth we see things as black and white, but this produces a "friction" (摩擦, masatsu) from what humanity really experiences. From these, the "curse" is lifted, this being the goal of the story.

On the inside cover of volume 2, Araki explained that the "-lion" ending in the title comes from both the Christian concept of blessing and the gospels ("evangelion" in Greek), and the Ancient Greek myth of Pygmalion.

== Chapters ==
The first chapter title of each pair is the title that is used in the volumization of JoJolion. The second title is the title used in the original serialization in Ultra Jump.

No.	Title	Japanese release date	Japanese ISBN
1 (105)	Welcome to Morioh Town; Yōkoso, Moriō-chō e (ようこそ 杜王町へ)	December 19, 2011	978-4-08-870311-4
1. "Welcome to Morioh Town" (ようこそ 杜王町へ, Yōkoso, Morioh-chō e); 2–5. "Soft & Wet (1–4)" (ソフト&ウェット その①〜④, Sofuto Ando Wetto Sono 1–4); 1. "The 'Wall Eye' Boy" (「壁の目」の男, "Kabe no Me" no Otoko); 2–3. "Who am I? (1–2)"; 4–5. "Soft & Wet (1–2)"
Yasuho Hirose discovers the body of a naked man underneath one of the Wall Eyes. While investigating his identity, they are nearly killed by someone who thinks the mysterious young man is Yoshikage Kira.
2 (106)	His Name Is Josuke Higashikata; Higashikata Jōsuke toiu Namae (東方定助という名前)	April 19, 2012	978-4-08-870413-5
6. "Soft & Wet (5)" (ソフト&ウェット その⑤, Sofuto Ando Wetto Sono 5); 7. "Josuke, Go to the Higashikata Family" (定助 東方家へ行く, Jōsuke Higashikata-ke e Iku); 8–9. "California King Bed (1–2)" (カリフォルニア・キング・ベッド その①〜②, Kariforunia Kingu Beddo Sono 1–2); 6. "Yoshikage Kira" (キラ・ヨシカゲ, Kira Yoshikage); 7. "People of the Higashikata Family" (東方家の人々, Higashikata-ke no Hitobito); 8–9. "Daiya Higashikata's Strange Love (1–2)" (東方大弥の異常な愛情①〜②, Higashikata Daiya no Ijō na Aijō 1–2)
The young man, now dubbed Josuke, is adopted by the Higashikata family. To return the favor of being given a home, Norisuke IV places him in charge of taking care of his blind daughter Daiya, who intends to use her own memory-stealing Stand to make Josuke her lover.
3 (107)	Their Family Tree; Sono Kakeizu (その家系図)	September 19, 2012	978-4-08-870526-2
10. "California King Bed (3)" (カリフォルニア・キング・ベッド その③, Kariforunia Kingu Beddo Sono 3); 11. "The Family Tree" (家系図, Kakeizu); 12–13. "'Paisley Park' and 'Born This Way' (1–2)" (『ペイズリー・パーク』と『ボーン・ディス・ウェイ』 その①〜②, "Peizurī Pāku" to "Bōn Disu Wei" Sono 1–2); 10. "Daiya Higashikata's Strange Love (3)" (東方大弥の異常な愛情③, Higashikata Daiya no Ijō na Aijō 3); 11. "The Secret of The SBR Race Record" (『SBRレース全記録』の秘密, "Esu Bī Āru Rēsu Zenkiroku" no Himitsu"); 12. "Morioh Town Navigation" (杜王町Navigation, Morioh-chō Nabigēshon); 13. "Pursuer" (追跡者, Tsuisekisha)
After besting Daiya, Josuke discovers the Higashikata family tree, leading him and Yasuho to pursue Yoshikage Kira's only known living relative: his mother, Holy Joestar-Kira. However, Josuke soon encounters two Stands, including one that seems to be helping him.
4 (108)	The Lemon and the Tangerine; Remon to Mikan (レモンとみかん)	May 17, 2013	978-4-08-870642-9
14–16. "'Paisley Park' & 'Born This Way' (3–5)" (『ペイズリー・パーク』と『ボーン・ディス・ウェイ』 その③〜⑤, "Peizurī Pāku" to "Bōn Disu Wei" Sono 3–5); 17. "The Lemon and the Tangerine" (レモンとみかん, Remon to Mikan); 18."'Shakedown Road' (1)" (『カツアゲロード』 その①, "Katsuage Rōdo" Sono 1); 14. "The End of the Pursuit" (追跡の果て, Tsuiseki no Hate); 15. "The Way to the Hospital" (病院への道, Byōin e no Michi); 16. "Pursuer" (追跡者, Tsuisekisha); 17. "Nijimura the Maid and Holy Joestar" (家政婦の虹村とホリー・ジョースター, Kaseifu no Nijimura to Horī Jōsutā); 18. "Trouble with the Curve"
Josuke defeats the enemy Stand with the help of Yasuho's emerging Stand before meeting its user: the Higashikatas' maid, Kei Nijimura. Meanwhile, Yasuho meets an afflicted Holy Joestar at Morioh's TG University Hospital. Several days later, Norisuke IV tasks Joshu with bringing Josuke to the local high school, which lies at the end of Morioh's infamous Shakedown Road.
5 (109)	Morioh Town: 1901; Moriō-chō "Sen Kyū-hyaku Ichi Nen" (杜王町『1901年』)	October 18, 2013	978-4-08-870830-0
19–21. "'Shakedown Road' (2–4)" (『カツアゲロード』その②〜④, "Katsuage Rōdo" Sono 2–4); 22. "Morioh Town: 1901" (杜王町『1901年』, Moriō-chō "Sen Kyū-hyaku Ichi Nen"); 19–20. "Trouble with the Curve (2–3)"; 21. "The Secret of Shakedown Road" (カツアゲロードの秘密, Katsuage Rōdo no Himitsu); 22. "The Legend of Johnny Joestar" (ジョニィ・ジョースターの伝説, Jonī Jōsutā no Densetsu)
Josuke and Joshu discover the truth behind Shakedown Road, and Josuke hears a legend from Morioh's past.
6 (110)	Tsurugi Higashikata's Goal, and the Architect; Higashikata Tsurugi no Mokuteki, Soshite Kenchikka (東方つるぎの目的 そして建築家)	March 19, 2014	978-4-08-870891-1
23–25. "Paper Moon Deception (1–3)" (ペーパー・ムーン まやかし その①〜③, Pēpā Mūn Mayakashi Sono 1–3); 26. "Tsurugi Higashikata's Goal, and the Architect" (東方つるぎの目的 そして建築家, Higashikata Tsurugi no Mokuteki, Soshite Kenchikka); 23. "The Secret Hideaway" (秘密の小部屋, Himitsu no Koheya); 24. "Tsurugi's Mystery" (つるぎのフシギ, Tsurugi no Fushigi); 25. "I'm Meeting Josuke Higashikata!" (東方定助に会え！, Higashikata Jōsuke ni Ae!); 26. "The Basement Dweller" (地下室の住人, Chikashitsu no Jūnin)
Yasuho unwillingly becomes acquainted with young Tsurugi Higashikata, but her abhorrence of the child's actions drives Tsurugi to put her under the thrall of his Stand. The mysterious architect Yotsuyu Yagiyama makes himself known.
7 (111)	King Nothing; Kingu Nasshingu (キング・ナッシング)	May 19, 2014	978-4-08-880087-5
27–29. "Norisuke Higashikata, Tsurugi Higashikata, and Yotsuyu Yagiyama (1–3)" (東方憲助と東方つるぎと八木山夜露 その①〜③, Higashikata Norisuke to Higashikata Tsurugi to Yagiyama Yotsuyu Sono 1–3); 30. "King Nothing" (キング・ナッシング, Kingu Nasshingu); 27. "Suspicious People" (疑惑の人々, Giwaku no Hitobito); 28. "The Higashikata Family Garden Terror" (東方家庭園の恐怖, Higashikata-ke Teien no Kyōfu); 29. "The Looming Objects" (迫りくる物体, Semarikuru Buttai); 30. "The Pursuit" (追跡, Tsuiseki)
Josuke and Norisuke IV find themselves under attack from Yotsuyu Yagiyama, the architect of the Higashikata estate. Wanting Yoshikage Kira dead at any cost, Yotsuyu has convinced Tsurugi to help him eliminate Josuke.
8 (112)	Every Day Is a Summer Vacation; Mainichi ga Natsuyasumi (毎日が夏休み)	October 17, 2014	978-4-08-880238-1
31–32. "'I Am a Rock' (1–2)" (『アイ・アム・ア・ロック』その①〜②, "Ai Amu A Rokku" Sono 1–2); 33. "Josuke! Go to the Higashikata Fruit Parlor" (定助！東方フルーツパーラーへ行く, Jōsuke! Higashikata Furūtsu Pārā e Iku); 34. "Every Day Is a Summer Vacation (1)" (毎日が夏休み その①, Mainichi ga Natsuyasumi Sono 1); 31. "Love of Gravity"; 32. "The Ambitions of Yotsuyu Yagiyama" (八木山夜露の野望, Yagiyama Yotsuyu no Yabō); 33. "The Fifth" (五代目, Godaime); 34. "That Man, Jobin." (その男、常敏。, Sono Otoko, Jōbin.)
Josuke has no choice but to fight the mysterious Yotsuyu Yagiyama, as he may have some clue toward how to cure the Higashikata family's curse. But when Yotsuyu seemingly dies, Josuke instead discovers that the family's eldest son Jobin Higashikata may know more than he lets on, and decides to make a bet with him to discover the truth.
9 (113)	Eldest Son: Jobin Higashikata; Danchō: Higashikata Jōbin (長男・東方常敏)	February 19, 2015	978-4-08-880314-2
35–37. "Every Day Is a Summer Vacation (2–4)" (毎日が夏休み その②〜④, Mainichi ga Natsuyasumi Sono 2–4); 38. "Jobin Higashikata Is a Stand User" (東方常敏はスタンド使い, Higashikata Jōbin wa Sutando Tsukai); 35. "Round One" (第一取組, Dai-Ichi Torikumi); 36. "The Second Game" (第2局, Dai-Ni-Kyoku); 37. "Heated Match" (熱戦, Nessen); 38. "Drive Recorder" (ドライブレコーダー, Doraibu Rekōdā)
Josuke enters his bet against Jobin to help Tsurugi and Yasuho discover exactly how he has come across the strange Locacaca fruit. He is told he will be pitting a giant stag beetle against one of Jobin's favorite beetles; along the way, he realizes that what he has actually entered is a battle of wits and Stands.
10 (114)	Follow the Locacaca Tree! Locacaca no Ki o Oe! (ロカカカの樹を追え!)	July 17, 2015	978-4-08-880436-1
39–42. "Doobie Wah (1–4)" (ドゥービー・ワゥ その①〜④, Dūbī Wau Sono 1–4); 39. "The Pursuit" (追跡, Tsuiseki); 40. "Follow Aisho Dainenjiyama!" (大年寺山愛唱に迫れ！, Dainenjiyama Aishō ni Semare!); 41. "Tornado of Fear" (恐怖のトルネード, Kyōfu no Torunēdo); 42. "Further Pursuit" (さらなる追跡, Saranaru Tsuiseki)
With information from Jobin's car, Yasuho and Tsurugi track down the mysterious Locacaca dealer Aisho Dainenjiyama. However, he soon discovers their presence and tries to kill them with his Stand, putting the two on the run as the tornado-like Doobie Wah! tracks them down.
11 (115)	The Twins Are Coming to Town; Sōji ga Machi ni Yattekuru (双児が町にやって来る)	December 18, 2015	978-4-08-880548-1
43–46. "Love Love Deluxe (1–4)" (ラブラブデラックス その①〜④, Rabu Rabu Derakkusu Sono 1–4); 43. "Secchan" (セッちゃん); 44. "What is My Name?"; 45. "Karera Sakunami the Runaway" (逃亡者作並カレラ, Tōbōsha Sakunami Karera); 46. "Combination Play" (コンビネーションプレイ, Konbinēshon Purei)
After Dainenjiyama is defeated, Yasuho and Josuke finally meet up, but Josuke is distracted by a young woman who seems to know who he is. He meets up with the woman, Karera Sakunami, to discover she does know his original identity; before he can learn enough from her, the two are attacked by a pair of Stand-using twins.
12 (116)	Hato's Boyfriend; Hato-chan no Bōifurendo (鳩ちゃんのボーイフレンド)	March 18, 2016	978-4-08-880647-1
47–49. "Hato Brought Her Boyfriend Home (1–3)" (鳩ちゃんがボーイフレンドを連れて来た その①〜③, Hato-chan ga Bōifurendo o Tsuretekita Sono 1–3); 50. "Vitamin C and Killer Queen (1)" (ビタミンCとキラークイーン その①, Bitamin Shī to Kirā Kuīn Sono 1); 47. "Guest" (お客様, Okyakusama); 48. "Tamaki Damo's Traces" (田最環の痕跡, Damo Tamaki no Konseki); 49. "Two Years Ago, at Sea." (二年前、洋上にて。, Ninenmae, Yōjō nite.); 50. "Josefumi, His Past" (仗世文、その過去, Josefumi, Sono Kako)
Hato introduces her boyfriend, Tamaki Damo, to the Higashikatas, who are soon incapacitated by Damo's liquifying Stand. While interrogating Norisuke, Damo begins to reveal Kira and Josefumi's past.
13 (117)	Walking Heart; Wōkingu Hāto (ウォーキング・ハート)	July 19, 2016	978-4-08-880742-3
51–53. "Vitamin C and Killer Queen (2–4)" (ビタミンCとキラークイーン その②〜④, Bitamin Shī to Kirā Kuīn Sono 2–4); 54. "Walking Heart" (ウォーキング・ハート, Wōkingu Hāto); 51. "The Grafting" (継ぎ木, Tsugiki); 52. "Trust" (信頼, Shinrai); 53. "Josefumi and Kira" (仗世文と吉良, Josefumi to Kira); 54. "Tamaki Damo Kills Again" (田最環は二度殺す, Damo Tamaki wa Nido Korosu)
Kira and Josefumi's story continues as they are confronted by the Rock Humans. In the present, Josuke and Hato attempt to overcome Damo's ability.
14 (118)	Dawn of the Higashikata Household; Higashikata-ke no Yoake (東方家の夜明け)	December 19, 2016	978-4-08-880880-2
55. "Walking Heart, Breaking Heart" (ウォーキング・ハート、ブレイキング・ハート, Wōkingu Hāto, Bureikingu Hāto); 56–57. "Milagro Man (1–2)" (ミラグロマン その①〜②, Miraguro Man Sono 1–2); 58. "Dawn of the Higashikata Household" (東方家の夜明け, Higashikata-ka no Yoake); 55. "Conclusion, and..." (決着、そして・・・, Kecchaku, Soshite...); 56–57. "Milagro Man (1–2)" (ミラグロマン その①〜②, Miraguro Man Sono 1–2); 58. "Meeting the Mother" (母との出会い, Haha to no Deai)
After Damo's defeat, Joshu seemingly lucks out as the money he steals begins to multiply. Meanwhile, Kaato Higashikata, Norisuke's ex-wife, is released from prison after a 15-year murder sentence.
15 (119)	Dolomite's Blue Lagoon; Doromite no Aoi Sangoshō (ドロミテの青い珊瑚礁)	July 19, 2017	978-4-08-880882-6
59–62. "Dolomite's Blue Lagoon (1–4)" (ドロミテの青い珊瑚礁 その①〜④, Doromite no Aoi Sangoshō Sono 1–4); 59–60. "The Man Who Lives by the Pond (1–2)" (池の辺に住む男 その①〜②, Ike no hen ni Sumu Otoko Sono 1–2); 61–62. "Blue Hawaii (1–2)" (ブルーハワイ その①〜②, Burū Hawai Sono 1–2)
Jobin enlists the help of Dolomite's Blue Lagoon, which can control those its victims touch, to eliminate Josuke.
16 (120)	Mother and Child; Haha to Ko (母と子)	September 19, 2017	978-4-08-881233-5
63. "Dolomite's Blue Lagoon (5)" (ドロミテの青い珊瑚礁 その①, Doromite no Aoi Sangoshō Sono 5); 64. "Mother and Child" (母と子, Haha to Ko); 65–66. "The Plant Appraiser – Rai Mamezuku (Age 31) (1–2)" (植物鑑定人 – 豆銑 礼(31) その①〜②, Shokubutsukanteinin – Mamezuku Rai (31) Sono 1–2); 63. "Blue Hawaii (3)" (ブルーハワイ その③, Burū Hawai Sono 3); 64–66. "The Plant Appraiser (1–3)" (植物鑑定人 その①〜③, Shokubutsukanteinin Sono 1–3)
After Dolomite's defeat, Josuke and Yasuho meet up with plant appraiser Rai Mamezuku on Norisuke's orders. The trio is soon attacked by Urban Guerilla and his pet, Doremifasolati Do.
17 (121)	Escape from Mount Hanarero; Hanareroyama kara Dasshutsu Shiro (鼻炉山から脱出しろ)	December 19, 2017	978-4-08-881443-8
67. "The Plant Appraiser – Rai Mamezuku (Age 31) (3)" (植物鑑定人 – 豆銑 礼(31) その③, Shokubutsukanteinin – Mamezuku Rai (31) Sono 3); 68–70. "Urban Guerrilla and Doremifasolati Do (1–3)" (アーバン・ゲリラとドレミファソラティ・ド その①〜③, Āban Gerira to Doremifasorati Do Sono 1–3); 67. "The Plant Appraiser (4)" (植物鑑定人 その④, Shokubutsukanteinin Sono 4); 68–70. "Rock Human and Rock Animal (1–3)" (岩人間と岩動物 その①〜③, Iwa Ningen to Iwa Dōbutsu Sono 1–3)
The battle against Urban Guerilla and Doremifasolati Do continues as Josuke, Yasuho, and Mamezuku try to avoid being dissolved.
18 (122)	North of the Higashikata Household. The Orchard; Higashikata-ke no Kita. Kajuen (東方家の北。果樹園)	July 19, 2018	978-4-08-881452-0
71. "The Qing Dynasty Hair Clip" (清の時代の髪留め, Shin no Jidai no Kamidome); 72. "North of the Higashikata Household. The Orchard" (東方家の北。果樹園, Higashikata-ke no Kita. Kajuen); 73–74. "Ozon Baby's Pressure (1–2)" (オゾン・ベイビーの加圧 その①〜②, Ozon Beibī no Kaatsu Sono 1–2); 71. "Something She Once Saw" (いつか見ていたもの, Itsuka Miteita Mono); 72–74. "Poor Tom and Ozon Baby (1–3)" (プアー・トムとオゾン・ベイビー その①〜③, Puā Tomu to Ozon Beibī Sono 1–3)
With their enemies defeated, Mamezuku sends Yasuho home as he and Josuke head for the Higashikata orchard. Meanwhile, Jobin plants a Stand in the orchard to ambush Josuke, only for him and his son to be attacked by it as well.
19 (123)	Orthopedic Surgeon Dr. Wu Tomoki; Seikeigekai – Ū Tomoki-sensei (整形外科医 – 羽伴毅先生)	October 19, 2018	978-4-08-881596-1
75–76. "Ozon Baby's Pressure (3–4)" (オゾン・ベイビーの加圧 その③〜④, Ozon Beibī no Kaatsu Sono 3–4); 77. "Go to TG University Hospital" (TG大学病院へ行く, Tījī Daigaku Byōin he Iku); 78. "Orthopedic Surgeon – Dr. Wu Tomoki" (整形外科医 – 羽伴毅先生, Seikeigekai – Ū Tomoki-sensei); 75–76. "Poor Tom and Ozon Baby (4–5)" (プアー・トムとオゾン・ベイビー その④〜⑤, Puā Tomu to Ozon Beibī Sono 4–5); 77–78. "Equivalent Exchange and the University Hospital (1–2)" (等価交換と大学病院 その①〜②, Tōka Kōkan to Daigaku Byōin Sono 1–2)
The battle between Josuke, Jobin, and Poor Tom reaches a boiling point as the orchard catches fire. Later, Yasuho runs into Mitsuba at TG University Hospital, witnessing the drastic results of the latter's repeated treatment.
20 (124)	Please Come With Me. Doctor Wu; Issho ni Onegai. Dokutā Ū (一緒にお願い。ドクター・ウー)	March 19, 2019	978-4-08-881777-4
79–82. "Doctor Wu and Awaking 3 Leaves (1–4)" (ドクター・ウーと目醒める3枚の葉っぱ その①〜④, Dokutā Ū to Mezameru Sanmai no Happa Sono 1–4); 79–82. "Equivalent Exchange and the University Hospital (3–6)" (等価交換と大学病院 その③〜⑥, Tōka Kōkan to Daigaku Byōin Sono 3–6)
Mitsuba's doctor, Wu Tomoki, reveals himself to be a Rock Human. As the two try to escape his attack, Yasuho bears witness to Mitsuba's own Stand ability.
21 (125)	The Wonder of You; Za Wandā Obu Yū (ザ・ワンダー・オブ・ユー)	July 19, 2019	978-4-08-882015-6
83. "The New Locacaca" (新しいロカカカ, Atarashī Rokakaka); 84–86. "The Wonder of You (1–3)" (ザ・ワンダー・オブ・ユー(君の奇跡の愛) その①〜③, Za Wandā Obu Yū (Kimi no Kiseki no Ai) Sono 1–3); 83. "Countdown to the Harvest" (収穫へのカウントダウン, Shūkaku e no Kauntodaun); 84–86. "The Head Doctor of TG University Hospital (1–3)" (TG大学病院の院長 その①〜③, TG Daigaku Byōin no Inchō Sono 1–3)
Having defeated Wu Tomoki, Josuke, Yasuho, and Mamezuku decide to pursue the university hospital's director with help from an intern named Toru. However, the heroes only succeed in inflicting injury upon themselves. Meanwhile, Mitsuba returns home, seemingly being followed by the hospital director.
22 (126)	TG University Hospital Head Doctor: Satoru Akefu; TG Daigaku Byōin Inchō – Akefu Satoru (TG大学病院院長 – 明負悟)	December 19, 2019	978-4-08-882167-2
87–90. "The Wonder of You (4–7)" (ザ・ワンダー・オブ・ユー(君の奇跡の愛) その④〜⑦, Za Wandā Obu Yū (Kimi no Kiseki no Ai) Sono 4–7); 87–88. "Ojiro Again (1–2)" (オージロー再び その①〜②, Ōjirō Futatabi Sono 1–2); 89–90. "Dangerous Pursuit (1–2)" (危険な追跡 その①〜②, Kikken na Tsuiseki Sono 1–2)
Having heard about the new Locacaca fruit, Ojiro assaults Jobin and Tsurugi in hopes of obtaining it for himself. Meanwhile, Josuke and Mamezuku realize their own enemy's true power, forcing Josuke to have himself returned to the hospital to confront it.
23 (127)	Whole Lotta Love; Mune Ippai no Ai wo (胸いっぱいの愛を)	April 17, 2020	978-4-08-882278-5
91–94. "The Wonder of You (8–11)" (ザ・ワンダー・オブ・ユー(君の奇跡の愛) その⑧〜⑪, Za Wandā Obu Yū (Kimi no Kiseki no Ai) Sono 8–11); 91–94. "Dangerous Pursuit (3–6)" (危険な追跡 その③〜⑥, Kikken na Tsuiseki Sono 3–6)
Josuke meets Holy at the hospital, who advises him to make the hospital director pursue him. At the same time, Yasuho investigates the Higashikata estate, where Jobin's discovery of Paisley Park puts her in grave danger. As Yasuho is wounded by Jobin's attempt on her life, calamity conspires to reveal the Locacaca fruit to the rest of the family.
24 (128)	Just Don't Move; Ugokanai Shikanai (動かないしかない)	October 16, 2020	978-4-08-882394-2
95. "The Wonder of You (12)" (ザ・ワンダー・オブ・ユー(君の奇跡の愛) その⑫, Za Wandā Obu Yū (Kimi no Kiseki no Ai) Sono 12); 96. "Just Don't Move" (動かないしかない, Ugokanai Shikanai); 97–98. "The Wonder of You (14–15)" (ザ・ワンダー・オブ・ユー(君の奇跡の愛) その⑭〜⑮, Za Wandā Obu Yū (Kimi no Kiseki no Ai) Sono 14–15); 95–98. "The Endless Calamity (1–4)" (終わりなき厄災 その①〜④, Owarinaki Yakusai Sono 1–4)
Jobin is forced to incapacitate his own father, but is himself killed shortly afterward by the force of calamity. Meanwhile, Mamezuku catches up to Josuke, and the two enter a standoff with the hospital director.
25 (129)	The Ultimate Dilemma; Kyūkyoku no Jirenma (究極のジレンマ)	December 18, 2020	978-4-08-882544-1
99–102. "The Wonder of You (16–19)" (ザ・ワンダー・オブ・ユー(君の奇跡の愛) その⑯〜⑲, Za Wandā Obu Yū (Kimi no Kiseki no Ai) Sono 16–19); 99–102. "The Endless Calamity (5–8)" (終わりなき厄災 その⑤〜⑧, Owarinaki Yakusai Sono 5–8)
Mamezuku is mortally wounded, but reveals a hidden power within Josuke's ability. At the same time, Joshu approaches Yasuho to heal her with the new Locacaca branch, and Toru finally reveals himself as the Stand User responsible for the recent calamities. Yasuho decides to call Josuke and expose the enemy's identity, putting her first in line to die via calamity.
26 (130)	Go Beyond; Gō Biyondo (ゴー・ビヨンド)	May 19, 2021	978-4-08-882697-4
103–104. "The Wonder of You (20-21)" (ザ・ワンダー・オブ・ユー(君の奇跡の愛) その⑳〜㉑, Za Wandā Obu Yū (Kimi no Kiseki no Ai) Sono 20-21); 105. "Safety First" (無事が何より, Buji ga Nani yori); 106. "Go Beyond" (ゴー・ビヨンド, Gō Biyondo); 103-104. "The Endless Calamity (9-10)" (終わりなき厄災 その⑨〜⑩, Owarinaki Yakusai Sono 9-10); 105. "The Invisible Soap Bubbles" (見えないしゃぼん玉, Mienai Shabon-Dama); 106. "Go Beyond" (ゴー・ビヨンド, Gō Biyondo)
Nijimura delivers Yasuho's call to Josuke at the cost of her own life. As the hospital director decides to escape, Josuke and Yasuho combine their abilities in one final attempt to overcome calamity.
27 (131)	When All Curses Are Broken; Subete no Noroi ga Tokeru Toki (全ての呪いが解けるとき)	September 17, 2021	978-4-08-882836-7
107. "When All Curses Are Broken" (全ての呪いが解けるとき, Subete no Noroi ga Tokeru Toki); 108. "Go Beyond (2)" (ゴー・ビヨンド その②, Gō Biyondo Sono 2); 109. "The Radio Gaga Incident: 1941" (ラヂオ・ガガ事件(1941年）, Radjio Gaga Jiken (1941-nen)); 110. "Higashikata Fruit Parlor" (東方フルーツパーラー, Higashikata Furūtsu Pārā); 107. "Kaato Higashikata's 'Attack'" (東方花都の"攻撃", Higashikata Kāto no "Kōgeki"); 108. "The Calamity's End" (最期の厄災, Saigo no Yakusai); 109-110. "The Radio Gaga Incident (1-2)" (ラヂオ・ガガ事件①〜②, Radjio Gaga Jiken 1-2)
Toru, gravely wounded by Josuke's attack, meets Kaato Higashikata, whose true intentions are revealed. A flashback depicts Lucy Steel's visit to Morioh, where she and a mysterious teenager encounter a living guard rail.

== Reception ==
JoJolion won the Grand Prize for Manga Division at the 17th Japan Media Arts Festival in 2013. On Takarajimasha's Kono Manga ga Sugoi! list, which surveys people in the manga and publishing industry, named JoJolion the 12th best manga series for male readers in 2013. The manga has been nominated for the 26th Tezuka Osamu Cultural Prize in 2022. JoJolion was nominated for the 53rd Seiun Award in the Best Comic category in 2022.

The first volume of JoJolion was the second best-selling manga for its debut week of December 19–25, 2011 with 237,374 copies sold. The second volume ranked third, with 204,791 copies, for the week of April 16–22, 2012. Its third volume debuted at number two for the week of September 17–23, selling 260,080 copies. All three were some of the best-selling manga of 2012; volume one was 46th with 534,996 copies, volume two was 53rd with 516,040, and volume 3 sold 457,791 copies for 69th. Volume four was number two for the week of May 12–18, 2013, selling 224,551 copies in its first week.
