= Jiro =

Jiro may refer to:

- Jiro (given name), including people with the name
- Jiro (musician) (born 1972), Japanese rock musician
- Jiro Ono (born 1925), Japanese sushi chef
- Jiro (software), a computer storage management technology
- Jiro (dog), a Sakhalian Husky that was part of the 1958 Japanese Antarctic Research Expedition

== See also ==
- Gero (disambiguation)
