= Steel Ball Run: JoJo's Bizarre Adventure =

Sixth season of JoJo's Bizarre Adventure anime

- Season 6
- Key visual, depicting Johnny Joestar (foreground) and Gyro Zeppeli (background)
- No. of episodes: 10

Release
- Original network: Netflix
- Original release: March 19, 2026 – present

Season chronology
- ← Previous; Season 5: Stone Ocean

Steel Ball Run: JoJo's Bizarre Adventure (Note: Stylized as STEEL BALL RUN JoJo's Bizarre Adventure) (Japanese: スティール・ボール・ラン ジョジョの奇妙な冒険, Hepburn: Sutīru Bōru Ran: JoJo no Kimyō na Bōken) is the sixth season of the JoJo's Bizarre Adventure anime television series produced by David Production, adapting Steel Ball Run, the seventh part of Hirohiko Araki's JoJo's Bizarre Adventure manga series.

Like the previous season, Steel Ball Run was released worldwide as an original net animation season on Netflix, with the first episode, referred to as the 1st Stage, having premiered on March 19, 2026. The next cours, referred to as the 2nd and 3rd Stages, began releasing on a weekly schedule on September 25 of the same year.

== Plot ==
In September 1890, (Note: The universe in which Steel Ball Run and succeeding parts take place is not related to the first six parts in any way beyond references to the names of some of its characters and a scant few recycled Stands.) riders from across the globe gather in the United States for the Steel Ball Run, a transcontinental horse race from San Diego to New York City offering a 50 million USD prize. Among them is paraplegic former jockey Johnny Joestar, who joins to study the mysterious "Spin" technique of Neapolitan Gyro Zeppeli after Gyro briefly restores his mobility. Though starting as rivals, Johnny and Gyro become close allies while surviving attacks from ruthless competitors.

== Voice cast ==
| Character | Japanese | English |
|---|---|---|
| Johnny Joestar | Shogo Sakata | Daman Mills |
| Gyro Zeppeli | Yōhei Azakami; Asuna Tomari (young) | Kaiji Tang; Greg Vinciguerra (young) |
| Lucy Steel | Rie Takahashi | Frankie Kevich |
| Steven Steel | Kenta Miyake | Jamieson Price |
| Diego Brando | Kaito Ishikawa; Saima Nakano (young) | Damien Haas; Erica Mendez (young) |
| Sandman | Masaaki Mizunaka | Alejandro Antonio Ruiz |
| Pocoloco | Kenichirou Matsuda | Cedric Williams |
| Funny Valentine | Tomokazu Sugita | Jason Marnocha |
| Mountain Tim | Tomoaki Maeno | Joshua David King |
| Hot Pants | Yoko Hikasa | TBA |
| Oyecomova | Noriaki Sugiyama | Taliesin Jaffe |
| Fritz von Stroheim | Atsushi Imaruoka | Dan Woren |
| Mrs. Robinson | Masaya Fukunishi | Alejandro Antonio Ruiz |
| Andre Boomboom | Yoshiki Nakajima | Jamison Boaz |
| Benjamin Boomboom | Jiro Saito | Christopher Swindle |
| L.A. Boomboom | Fumiyoshi Shioya | Matt Shipman |
| Pork Pie Hat Kid | Jun Fukushima | Greg Vinciguerra |
| Luke | Daisuke Egawa | Dave B. Mitchell |
| Bishop | Ko Bonkobara | TBA |
| Urmd Avdul | Kenta Miyake | Nazeeh Tarsha |
| Gregorio Zeppeli | Nobuo Tobita | Keythe Farley |
| Marco | Manaka Iwami | Abby Trott |
| King's Messenger | Mitsuaki Hoshino | Tony Amendola |
| Diego's mother | Yuka Terasaki | Abby Trott |

== Production and release ==
In April 2025, as part of the JoJoday event held to celebrate the JoJo's Bizarre Adventure series, an anime adaptation of Steel Ball Run produced by David Production was announced. Key art, as well as character art for Johnny Joestar and Gyro Zeppeli, were revealed alongside a promotional video. In July 2025 during Anime Expo, the main production staff for the adaptation was revealed. Golden Wind co-directors Yasuhiro Kimura and Hideya Takahashi reprised their roles, alongside returning series director Toshiyuki Kato, while Yasuko Kobayashi is overseeing series composition. Daisuke Tsumagari returns as character designer, and Yugo Kanno is composing the music, with Yoshikazu Iwanami serving again as sound director. As with previous installments, David Production is handling animation production. Additional details, such as the release year and main character castings, were revealed during a livestream event in September of the same year.

Following the premiere of the first episode on March 19, 2026, which covered the 1st stage of the race, Kimura stated that he was not sure when more episodes would be released. Several days later on March 28, a new teaser trailer was released, which revealed that Steel Ball Run would return sometime later in the year. On April 6, Netflix announced that the next cours would be released weekly in late 2026. In July of the same year at Anime Expo 2026, it was announced that the cours, which consist of 11 episodes, would be released weekly starting on September 25. It covers the 2nd and 3rd stages of the race.

The opening theme song is "Spin", performed by Kroi, while the ending theme song is "Shinu ka Ikiru ka" (死ぬか生きるか; lit. 'To Die or Live'), performed by Yuki Chiba. This marks the first original ending theme for a full cours in the series that is not a pre-existing licensed Western song. The song itself was heavily panned online, with many considering it lackluster compared to past ending themes.

== Episodes ==
| No. overall (Note: Order of episodes in the series continuing from the previous season) | No. in season (Note: Order of episodes within the season) | Title (Note: English episode titles are taken from Netflix. In instances where names are altered from the Japanese version, the original Japanese translation is used on the left while the edited Netflix title is used on the right.) | Directed by (Note: Production staff information is taken from the ending credits of each episode.) | Written by | Storyboarded by | Original release date |
|---|---|---|---|---|---|---|
1st Stage
| 191 | 1 | "Steel Ball Run"; Transliteration: "Sutīru Bōru Ran" (Japanese: スティール・ボール・ラン) | Toshiyuki Kato & Yasuhiro Kimura | Yasuko Kobayashi | Toshiyuki Kato & Yasuhiro Kimura | March 19, 2026 (Note: Episode 191 is a 47-minute special) |
In September 1890, 3,852 jockeys from around the world assemble in San Diego to take part in the Steel Ball Run, a transcontinental horse race to New York City with a $50,000,000 grand prize. While signing up for the race, Neapolitan rider Gyro Zeppeli duels and defeats a thief with a steel ball imbued with supernatural rotational energy. Johnny Joestar, a former celebrity jockey turned paraplegic after he was shot in his spine, touches one of the steel balls while it is still spinning and briefly regains his mobility. Determined to learn the secret behind Gyro's "Spin", Johnny tames an experienced but rowdy horse named Slow Dancer and joins the race. The first stage of the race is a 15-kilometer dash to a nearby church. Major contenders who prove themselves include Sandman, a Native American running without a horse, Diego "Dio" Brando, a British prodigy, and Pocoloco, a happy-go-lucky African American racer who initially missed the start of the race but who catches up through exceptional luck. These three, Johnny, and Gyro all approach the finish line neck-and-neck, but Gyro uses the Spin to lift his cape and gain a marginal headwind with his horse, Valkyrie, to cross the finish line first.
2nd & 3rd Stage
| 192 | 2 | "The Sheriff's Request to Mountain Tim"; Transliteration: "Maunten Timu e no Irai" (Japanese: マウンテン・ティムへの依頼) | Hirofumi Ogura | Shinichi Inotsume | Taizo Yoshida | September 25, 2026 |
Race organizer Steven Steel declares Sandman to be the winner of the first stage, as Gyro is penalized and moved down 20 ranks for using his steel balls as weapons near the end of the stage. Although Gyro concedes the result, he ruins Steven's celebratory gathering as revenge by causing wine bottles to burst with the Spin. Before the start of the second stage, the local sheriff deputizes jockey Mountain Tim to investigate the murders of three race participants that occurred during the previous stage. Gyro agrees to team up with Johnny so he can learn the Spin, so long as Gyro remains in the lead. Shortly after the second stage begins, Gyro and Johnny take a shortcut through the desert, which many racers refuse to take due to its lack of water resources. Six hours into their journey, the duo get pierced by multiple rounds of cholla cactus needles as they are tailed by another jockey. Gyro moves to use his steel balls on their pursuer, Mrs. Robinson, (Note: "Robinson" in official English releases.) who uses his insects' wing vibrations to trigger the cholla needles in any direction he desires. Gyro's deflected Spin completely disrupts the insects' movements, causing Mrs. Robinson to be defeated by his own attack method. Mountain Tim arrives shortly after the battle, confirming that Mrs. Robinson's horse does not match a distinctive hoofprint found at the murder scene.
| 193 | 3 | "The Desert-Born Outlaws"; Transliteration: "Sabaku de Umareta Narazumono" (Japanese: 砂漠で生まれたならず者) | Shūgo Tsuneoka | Shōgo Yasukawa | Shūgo Tsuneoka | October 2, 2026 |
An approaching jockey, Andre Boomboom, (Note: "Andrew Boomboom" in official English releases.) requests help with a venomous bite. A suspicious Gyro tosses him a torch to burn the poison out. While treating himself, Andre asphyxiates himself seemingly to death, luring Gyro to touch his knife. His brother L.A. Boomboom (Note: "Laurence Boomboom" in official English releases.) and father Benjamin Boomboom (Note: "Benny Boomboom" in official English releases.) arrive and wield a supernatural ability to control iron, damaging Gyro with the iron in his blood; however, Gyro and Johnny manage to escape. Benjamin recalls visiting a place called the Devil's Palm, a moving geological phenomenon shunned by Native Americans from which his family obtained their powers. He uses his ability to reshape his own face and disguise himself as Johnny; he then uses his horse, which has the distinctive hoofprint Mountain Tim is pursuing, to lure Mountain Tim into a trap. However, Mountain Tim escapes with his own ability that allows him to segment his own body along his rope. Benjamin escapes, with Mountain Tim assuming him to be Johnny; Benjamin plans to ambush his three foes when Mountain Tim chases down the others.
| 194 | 4 | "The Devil's Palm"; Transliteration: "Akuma no Tenohira" (Japanese: 悪魔の手のひら) | Kayona Yamada | Shōgo Yasukawa | Toshiyuki Katō | October 9, 2026 |
Mountain Tim pursues Johnny and Gyro, who are pulled backwards off their horses by their now-shared magnetic attraction. Mountain Tim, realizing the magnetic attack is not theirs, climbs away with his rope ability called Oh! Lonesome Me (Note: "Lasso Blues" in official English releases.). He explains it is called a Stand, a power he gained 15 years ago in an expedition to the Devil's Palm from which only he survived. The Boombooms then attack utilizing the iron in sand. In desperation before his body implodes, Johnny uses the Spin on a spent bullet, but Benjamin kicks his hand aside. However, Johnny's fingernails suddenly begin to spin; he involuntarily fires them, killing Benjamin. Mountain Tim acknowledges this as a Stand, the Devil's Palm having manifested at their location. As they escape, L.A. exclaims that the Boombooms were pursuing a bounty on Gyro's head.
| 195 | 5 | "The Terrorist from a Faraway Country"; Transliteration: "Tōi Kuni kara Kita Terorisuto" (Japanese: 遠い国から来たテロリスト) | Shūgo Tsuneoka | Kazuyuki Fudeyasu | Yoriyasu Kogawa | October 16, 2026 |
Johnny, Gyro, and Mountain Tim are the first three to make it to the checkpoint town as Gyro refuses to elaborate on his origins. A mysterious individual enters their room searching for Gyro and is confronted by Mountain Tim. The man attacks Mountain Tim with his Stand, Boku no Rhythm wo Kiitekure, (Note: "Tic Tac Boom" in official English releases.) which can turn anything he touches into a timed bomb. Gyro recognizes him as Oyecomova, (Note: "Oye" in official English releases.) a terrorist from his home of the Kingdom of Naples who tried to assassinate the king. Gyro manages to survive an attempt to blow up his hands by redirecting the explosion to his right leg, and he and Johnny pursue Oyecomova on horseback over a river. Despite Oyecomova's attempts to blow them up, Gyro and Johnny use their abilities to kill Oyecomova and move forward towards Red Canyon to find a gift from Gyro's home called the "Zombie Horse" that will heal Gyro's wounds.
| 196 | 6 | "Gyro Zeppeli's Destiny"; Transliteration: "Jairo Tseperi no Shukumei" (Japanese: ジャイロ・ツェペリの宿命) | Fukutarō Takahashi | Kazuyuki Fudeyasu | Yoriyasu Kogawa | October 23, 2026 |
Gyro and Johnny find the Zombie Horse, a mural impressed against a rock wall, and Gyro uses its thread to heal his leg. A flashback reveals that in the Kingdom of Naples, Gyro was raised by his father, Gregorio, a renowned doctor who also taught him the Spin technique. When he turned 13, Gyro learned that his father and their ancestors were royal executioners who used Spin to calm prisoners before killing them. Gyro was set to succeed his father when he turned 25; however, Marco, a 10-year old servant to a baron who threatened the king, was set to receive the death penalty despite not being involved with the plot. Not willing to kill an innocent child, Gyro learned from the king's servant that winning the Steel Ball Run could convince the king to grant Marco a royal pardon. In the present, Gyro and Johnny are pursued by German cyborg racer Fritz von Stroheim, who Gyro defeats with his steel balls. As Gyro goes forward, a mummified arm emerges from Johnny's hand.
| 197 | 7 | "Tusk, Part 1"; Transliteration: "Tasuku - Sono Ichi" (Japanese: 牙(タスク) その①) | Tetsuji Nakamura | Yasuko Kobayashi | Tetsuji Nakamura | October 30, 2026 |
The mummified arm goes back into Johnny's body. It is revealed that Funny Valentine, the President of the United States, designed the route of the Steel Ball Run race so that the racers will come across similar body parts using a map designed by Joseph of Arimathea shortly after the Crucifixion of Jesus. Suspecting Gyro or Johnny has one of the body parts, Valentine sends an assassin after them. The assassin, named Pork Pie Hat Kid, (Note: "Bamboo Hat Kid" in official English releases.) has a Stand called Wired (Note: "Roped" in official English releases.) that allows him to lower hooks into a dish of water and use objects to reel his victims in, and he successfully captures Gyro and the horses. As Johnny is about to surrender the mummified arm inside him in exchange for his own life, a small pink creature emerges from his arm.
| 198 | 8 | "Tusk, Part 2"; Transliteration: "Tasuku - Sono Ni" (Japanese: 牙(タスク) その②) | Takahiro Kaneko | Yasuko Kobayashi | Fuminori Kizaki | November 6, 2026 |
The creature causes Johnny to shoot his toenails at Pork Pie Hat Kid to defend himself and imprints the words "Movēre crūs" onto his arm. Deducing the assassins are also looking for the body parts, Johnny finds Gyro's steel ball on the ground and becomes determined to retrieve the parts to gain more power. Johnny hides himself in the sand, but Pork Pie Hat Kid returns Slow Dancer so it will search for Johnny and reveal his location. When Pork Pie Hat Kid attempts to set Johnny on fire, Johnny uses his ability to carve a decoy a wooden decoy of himself, then shoots his nails at Pork Pie Hat Kid with his Stand, which he names Tusk. Johnny goes to retrieve Gyro, but Pork Pie Hat Kid uses him as bait. Johnny surrenders the mummified arm, however, Gyro uses Spin on the arm's nails to attack Pork Pie Hat Kid, defeating him. Gyro returns the arm to Johnny and theorizes that it may have belonged to a holy person. As the pair race to the end of the second stage, Johnny realizes that the writing on his arm may also be a map to where the next body part is. Valentine is informed that Johnny still has the arm and demonstrates that he has the heart of the corpse inside him, which Lucy secretly witnesses. The next day, the third stage of the race begins.
| 199 | 9 | "Scary Monsters, Part 1 / Frightening Monsters, Part 1"; Transliteration: "Sukearī Monsutāzu - Sono Ichi" (Japanese: スケアリー モンスターズ その①) | Akiko Sano, Teppei Taketani & Yūki Nishihata | Hiroshi Seko | Yoriyasu Kogawa | November 13, 2026 |
While continuing the race through the Rocky Mountains, Johnny and Gyro pass an injured Dio lying near some dinosaur fossils. A seemingly rejuvenated Dio eventually catches up to them and suggests that they should spend the night at a nearby village together. Johnny notices Dio acting strangely animalistic while deformities such as scales and fangs appear on his body. After Johnny and Gyro find a bear carcass near their door, they find that Dio has transformed into a dinosaur and are attacked by him. Realizing that he can only see moving objects, the pair stay still on the bear carcass and use Gyro's steel ball to drive him away. However, the bear carcass then also transforms into a larger dinosaur.
| 200 | 10 | "Scary Monsters, Part 2 / Frightening Monsters, Part 2"; Transliteration: "Sukearī Monsutāzu - Sono Ni" (Japanese: スケアリー モンスターズ その②) | Kyōhei Suzuki | Hiroshi Seko | Taizo Yoshida | November 20, 2026 |
A flashback reveals Dio was raised by his mother working on a farm in an impoverished region of Britain. After his mother refused the farmer's sexual advances, he cut holes in their stew cups. Refusing to sacrifice her or her son's dignity, Dio's mother had the scorching hot stew poured into her hands to feed her son. After she died of tetanus a year later, Dio grew up resentful of those who refused to help and swore to climb the echelons of society to claim his vengeance. In the present, Gyro recognizes the pattern on Johnny's arm as constellations and sees that the next part of the corpse is on some nearby mountaintops. They escape from the village and are pursued by Dio as well as villagers and rats that have also transformed into dinosaurs. Johnny and Gyro also find themselves transforming, though Johnny's corpse arm is slowing his transformation. They locate the corpse's eyeballs on the mountain, but Dio uses the villagers as a makeshift bridge and catches up with them, claiming the eyeballs.
