= Gyro zeppeli =

Scientific classification
- Kingdom: Animalia
- Phylum: Arthropoda
- Subphylum: Chelicerata
- Class: Arachnida
- Order: Araneae
- Infraorder: Araneomorphae
- Family: Theridiidae
- Genus: Gyro; Lin & Li, 2024
- Species: G. zeppeli

Binomial name
- Gyro zeppeli Lin & Li, 2024

Species of spider

Gyro is a monotypic genus of spiders in the family Theridiidae containing the single species, Gyro zeppeli.

== Distribution ==
Gyro zeppeli is endemic to Yunnan, China.

== Etymology ==
The etymologies of genus and species are not given in the original publication. However, it most likely refers to JoJo's Bizarre Adventure: Steel Ball Run character Gyro Zeppeli.
