= The JoJoLands =

Ninth story arc of JoJo's Bizarre Adventure

- First tankōbon volume cover, featuring Jodio Joestar
- Manga
- Written by: Hirohiko Araki
- Published by: Shueisha
- Imprint: Jump Comics
- Magazine: Ultra Jump
- Original run: February 17, 2023 – present
- Volumes: 9
- Chronology
- Preceded by: JoJolion
- icon

The JoJoLands (stylized as The JOJOLands) is the ninth main story arc of the Japanese manga series JoJo's Bizarre Adventure, written and illustrated by Hirohiko Araki. It takes place within the rebooted continuity depicted in Steel Ball Run (2004–2011) and JoJolion (2011–2021). Set in the U.S. state of Hawaii in the early 2020s, it follows Jodio Joestar, a teenage gangster intent on becoming wealthy in the tropics. It has been serialized by Shueisha in the seinen manga magazine Ultra Jump since February 17, 2023.

== Plot ==
Jodio Joestar is a high schooler and gofer living with his family on Oahu, Hawaii. He works for his principal Meryl Mei Qi alongside his older brother (Note: Attributed to multiple sources:) Dragona and their kleptomaniac classmate Paco Laburantes. Together with client-turned partner Usagi Alohaoe, they travel to Big Island to perform a heist against manga artist Rohan Kishibe. During their mission, the gang discovers a Lava Rock with the ability to attract anything of value that its user touches with the rock. They become allies with Big Island resident Charming Man, who hopes to use the rock to investigate his younger brother's disappearance on the slopes of Hualālai.

The gang tells Meryl Mei about the Lava Rock, and she decides to use it to gain all the assets of the infrastructure development company Howler, including its land on Hualālai. Soon after the gang touches Howler's land deed with the Lava Rock, Howler's lender Dolphin Bank moves to seize Howler's assets, in response to accusations of illegal activities by the government. The current head of the Howler company, Hacca Howler, speculates that this was caused by the Lava Rock, and sends agents Bobby Jean and Lulu to take it for him. Jodio kills Bobby Jean and captures Lulu. The team decides to confront Howler directly, using Charming Man's illusion ability to trick Howler into giving them his property himself.

Howler's agents Ningbo and Laem Chabang storm Meryl Mei's hideout, but Paco swiftly deals with Ningbo. Meanwhile, Jodio, Dragona, and Charming Man, disguised as Dolphin Bank employees, arrange a meeting with Hacca and his other agent, Key West, on his yacht. The Lava Rock in Dragona's possession begins to deteriorate in the presence of their bribery money, heightening Hacca's suspicions. A careless warning shot by Hacca causes the yacht to begin sinking, inviting firefighters and the FBI to interfere. At the same time, Laem and Key West discover the team's plan and decide to betray both sides for their own gain. Lulu remains loyal to Howler and incapacitates Laem herself, while Key West is dealt with by Jodio and Dragona. Even after Hacca figures out their plan, the threat of the FBI seizing his assets is enough to compel him to sign away his assets and flee regardless. The team leaves the yacht victorious, despite the Lava Rock crumbling to dust in their hands.

Nine months later, a scammer contacts Usagi's mother and sister, convincing them to disappear from the house. Meryl Mei immediately deduces that Usagi's situation is a ploy to extract information about the Lava Rock from them. As they currently lack a Lava Rock to fight back with, Jodio calls Rohan over the phone; however, Rohan realizes that the enemy is monitoring their conversation, and decides to publish a hint in the next chapter of his manga instead. The team also contacts Charming Man, who infiltrates the military and stumbles upon an operation to track the team. As Jodio's group takes a submarine to Hualālai to meet up with him, the enemy sends a Stand to confront them with an offer of their own.

== Characters ==
- Jodio Joestar (Note: Jodio Joestar (ジョディオ・ジョースター, Jodio Jōsutā)) is a 15-year-old gangster living with his family on Oahu, Hawaii, where he acts as a gofer for the state's underground drug trade. Despite his popularity among his peers, Jodio finds it difficult to be truly happy and is diagnosed with antisocial personality disorder by his school's psychotherapist. He does not intend to make friends, and his goal is to become incredibly rich by all means. Using his Stand, November Rain, (Note: November Rain (11月の雨(ノーヴェンバー・レイン), Nōvenbā Rein)) he can generate raindrops and freely manipulate their weight.
- Dragona Joestar (Note: Dragona Joestar (ドラゴナ・ジョースター, Doragona Jōsutā)) is Jodio's 18-year-old brother who works with him in the underground drug trade, while also working at Iko Iko, a fashion boutique run by Meryl Mei Qi. Dragona was assigned male at birth but presents feminine, having breast implants and wearing women's clothing. Dragona wields the Stand Smooth Operators, (Note: Smooth Operators (スムース・オペレイターズ, Sumūsu Opereitāzu)) a group of small robot-like Stands that have the ability to displace anything, and slide things along the surfaces they are attached to. It can also apply to severe wounds.
- Paco Laburantes (Note: Paco Laburantes (パコ・ラブランテス, Pako Raburantesu)) is a 19-year-old classmate of Jodio's and former military personnel. He comes from an abusive household, having one of his ears partially bitten off by his father, and engages in theft as if it were a sport. Using his Stand, The Hustle, (Note: The Hustle (THE(ザ)ハッスル, Za Hassuru)) he has expert control over his own musculature, but also those of others; he can bulge and vibrate his muscles along with those of anyone he touches, aiding him in both sleights of hand and combat.
- Usagi Alohaoe (Note: Usagi Alohaoe (ウサギ・アロハオエ, Usagi Arohaoe)) is a 17-year-old classmate of Jodio's and takes part in the heist under Meryl Mei Qi's request. A frequent customer for drugs, the rest of the gang see him as a hindrance and an addict. Despite this, he attempts to be helpful and friendly towards each member at every opportunity. Usagi wields the Stand The Mattekudasai, (Note: The Mattekudasai (THE MATTEKUDASAI(ザ・マッテクダサイ), Za Mattekudasai)) which can take the form of another object upon the request of anyone besides himself.
- Charming Man (Note: Charming Man (チャーミング・マン, Chāmingu Man)) is a 21-year-old resident of Big Island and new ally of Jodio. Believing there is a connection between the lava rock and his missing brother Mauka, (Note: Mauka (マウカ, Mauka)) Charming Man initially pursues the gang to find answers about his brother's disappearance. His Stand, Big Mouth Strikes Again, (Note: Big Mouth Strikes Again (ビッグマウス・ストライクス・アゲイン, Biggu Mausu Sutoraikusu Agein)) gives him the ability to transform his body into sand fragments, which he uses to disguise himself as other people, detach and remotely control body parts, manipulate people's perception of depth, blend into the scenery, and create illusions.
- Meryl Mei Qi (Note: Meryl Mei Qi (メリル・メイ・チー, Meriru Mei Chī)) is the principal of Jodio's school and owner of fashion boutique Iko Iko. Using the boutique as a front for her criminal business, she acts as the gang's boss and has networks in places such as the airport and the police. She instructs the gang to perform a heist on the Big Island and requests they take Usagi Alohaoe with them. Following the group's return, she decides to have them take control of the Howler Company using the Lava Rock.
- Barbara Ann Joestar (Note: Barbara Ann Joestar (バーバラ・アン・ジョースター, Bābara An Jōsutā)) is the daughter of Joseph Joestar from JoJolion and the mother of Jodio and Dragona Joestar. Everyone in the neighborhood respects and assists her due to her son's reputation in crime. After her husband abandons the family, Barbara Ann is forced to raise Jodio and Dragona alone, leading the siblings to become involved in criminal activities for her sake without her knowledge.
- Rohan Kishibe (Note: Rohan Kishibe (岸辺 露伴, Kishibe Rohan)) is a successful Japanese manga artist visiting Big Island. Under the pretense of a 15-day vacation, Rohan conducts experiments using the wealth-attracting properties of certain lava rocks he found on Hualālai's slopes. Jodio and his gang are initially tasked to steal an expensive diamond from his villa after info about it is leaked to Meryl Mei. Like in Diamond Is Unbreakable and Thus Spoke Kishibe Rohan, Rohan wields the Stand Heaven's Door, (Note: Heaven's Door (ヘブンズ・ドアー, Hebunzu Doā)) which allows him to temporarily turn living beings into books that he can freely read or write commands into.
- Howler Company (Note: Howler Company (Howler(ハウラー)社, Haurā-sha)) is a water resource and power generation infrastructure company headquartered in Honolulu and owns several areas of land all across Hawaii. Originally Howler Farms, (Note: Howler Farms (Howler(ハウラー)牧場, Haurā Bokujō)) it was established by an Italian sailor shipwrecked in Hawaii in 1843 whose original surname was Latrato and changed to Howler after Hawaii joined the United States. At some point, Latrato discovered a Lava Rock. After marrying a local woman and being granted verbal approval by the Hawaiian royal family to own land, Latrato's discovery of hidden underground water on the northern mountainside slopes of Hualālai turned the barren, volcanic grounds into fertile meadows. Descendants of the Howler family eventually turned the farm into the Howler Company and amassed 50 billion dollars in assets from port rights, transportation, arms industries, etc. Although they claim to be nature conservationists, it is believed that the company is involved in illegal activities. No proof of this has publicly come up due to Howler employing Stand users to get rid of those who investigate too deeply into the company. Meryl sends Jodio's gang to aid her in taking all of the company's assets via the Lava Rock.
  - Hacca Howler (Note: Hacca Howler (アッカ・ハウラー, Akka Haurā)) is the current 8th head of the Howler family and CEO of the Howler Company. Wealthy and arrogant, he indulges in his luxuries and enjoys showing off his vast wealth and power. As a child, Hacca was shown the destroyed remnants of Latrato's Lava Rock by his grandfather, who told him about how it saved the family from destitution. Years later, he inherited the Howler Company and established a head office in Honolulu after receiving a 38 billion dollar loan from Dolphin Bank. He is a Stand user, wielding the stand Eclipse Eight, (Note: Eclipse Eight (エクリプス8エイト, Ekuripusu Eito)) though its abilities are currently unknown.
  - Lulu (Note: Lulu (ルル, Ruru)) is a demanding but intelligent orphaned girl affiliated with the Howler Company under Hacca Howler's orders. She and Bobby Jean are assigned to get rid of Jodio's gang when they attempt to get the company land deeds but is later held hostage in Iko Iko. Her Stand is Bags' Groove, (Note: Bags' Groove (バグス・グルーヴ, Bagusu Gurūvu)) a group of microscopic bug-like humanoid creatures that can inflict lesions and other symptoms such as rashes, pulmonary edema, and tumors onto victims. She believes that Hacca is her biological father.
  - Bobby Jean (Note: Bobby Jean (ボビー・ジーン, Bobī Jīn)) is an investigative agent for the Howler Company, tracking down Jodio's group after they viewed the company's land deeds. As a respectable member of the company, he is straightforwardly secretive and respected by others but constantly bossed by his partner Lulu. He is later killed by Jodio after pursuing the gang at the hospital. With his Stand, Glory Days, (Note: Glory Days (グローリー・デイズ, Gurōrī Deizu)) he can control the movement and speed of the bullets he shoots from his USP45 semi-automatic pistol, equipped with a silencer.
  - Key West, (Note: Key West (キー・ウエスト, Kī Uesuto)) Laem Chabang, (Note: Laem Chabang (レムチャバン, Remu Chaban)) and Ningbo (Note: Ningbo (寧波, Ninpō)) are a lawyer, police officer, and firefighter respectively hired by Howler to find Lulu. Former associates of Bobby Jean, they align themselves with Hacca to investigate Bobby Jean's mysterious death. Key West stays by Hacca's side while Laem Chabang and Ningbo visit Meryl Mei to investigate Paco Laburantes, believing he was responsible for their former ally's demise. Laem Chabang's Stand, Lyin' Eyes, (Note: Lyin' Eyes (偽りの瞳, Itsuwari no Hitomi)) uses the nematodes she raises in her glasses to detect stress like a polygraph, and make an olfactive map of people through their 'fear'. Ningbo's Stand, 200 Balloons, (Note: 200 Balloons (200(トゥハンドレッド)バルーンズ, Tuhandoreddo Barūnzu)) allows him to inflate anything he touches until it bursts like a balloon. Key West's Stand, West End Girl, (Note: West End Girl (ウエスト・エンド・ガール, Uesuto Endo Gāru)) can appear in gaps between objects to obstruct and attack with crushing pressure using its many hands.

== Production and release ==
The JoJoLands is written and illustrated by Hirohiko Araki. It was announced in August 2021 following the conclusion of JoJolion, the previous part of JoJo's Bizarre Adventure, and began serialization in Shueisha's monthly seinen manga magazine Ultra Jump on February 17, 2023.

=== Volumes ===
The first chapter title of each pair is the title used in the collected volumes. The second is the title used in the original serialization in Ultra Jump.

No.	Title	Japanese release date	Japanese ISBN
1 (132)	Departure; Shuppatsu (Dipāchā) (出発 DEPARTURE)	August 18, 2023	978-4-08-883606-5
1. "Departure" (出発 DEPARTURE, Shuppatsu (Dipāchā)); 2. "South King Street" (サウス・キング・ストリート, Sausu Kingu Sutorīto); 3–4. "The Villa on Hawaii Island (1–2)" (ハワイ島の別荘 その①〜②, Hawai-tō no Bessō Sono 1–2); 1. "Mechanism" (仕組み(メカニズム), Mekanizumu); 2. "The Japanese Person on Hawaii Island" (ハワイ島にいる日本人, Hawai-tō ni Iru Nihonjin); 3. "Search for the Diamond in the Mansion" (豪邸にあるダイヤを探せ, Gōtei ni Aru Daiya o Sagase); 4. "VS. Rohan Kishibe" (vs.岸辺露伴, vs.Kishibe Rohan)
Jodio Joestar and his companions are tasked with stealing a diamond from Rohan Kishibe, who is on vacation in the Hawaiian Islands. After a Stand-wielding stray cat attacks them, Rohan catches and interrogates Jodio's allies.
2 (133)	"Rise Up" "Nobotte Ike" (『上って行け』)	December 19, 2023	978-4-08-883765-9
5. "'Rise Up'" (『上って行け』, "Nobotte Ike"); 6–8. "Mount Hualālai - Cat Size (1–3)" (フアラライ山 - キャット・サイズ その①〜③, Fuararai-san - Kyatto Saizu Sono 1–3); 5. "November Rain" (11月の雨(ノーベンバー・レイン), Nōbenbā Rein); 6–7. "Jungle Warfare (1–2)" (ジャングルの攻防 その①〜②, Janguru no Kōbō Sono 1–2); 8. "Let's Go Look at Luxury Watches" (高級時計を見に行こう, Kōkyūdokei o Mi ni Ikou)
Using his Stand, November Rain, Jodio manages to turn the tables and incapacitate Rohan. The group then discovers and steals a chunk of cooled lava with wealth-attracting properties, only to be attacked by three of the Stand User cats, who also seek the rock.
3 (134)	"Money-Making Time" "Kanemōke no Jikan" (『金儲けの時間』)	April 18, 2024	978-4-08-884038-3
9–11. "Kailua-Kona - Flight Waiting Time (1–3)" (カイルア・コナ - フライト待ち時間 その①〜③, Kairua Kona - Furaito Machijikan Sono 1–3); 12. "Charming Man" (チャーミング・マン, Chāmingu Man); 9. "The Owner of the Lava Rock" (溶岩の持ち主, Yōgan no Mochinushi); 10–11. "The Hustle (1–2)" (THE ハッスル その①〜②, Za Hassuru Sono 1–2); 12. "His Name is 'Charming Man'" (その名も"チャーミングマン", Sono Na mo "Chāminguman")
An experiment in the luxury watch store almost goes wrong, and a mysterious pursuer attempts to take the lava rock from the team. The pursuer seems to know something about the Lava Rock that Rohan doesn't; a potential alliance may be needed to learn more.
4 (135)	"Joestar Brothers" "Jōsutā Kyōdai" (『ジョースター兄弟』)	August 19, 2024	978-4-08-884157-1
13. "Joestar Brothers" (ジョースター兄弟, Jōsutā Kyōdai); 14–15. "Aim for That Fifty Billion Dollars (1–2)" (その価値500億ドルを狙え その①〜②, Sono Kachi 500 Oku-Doru o Nerae Sono 1–2); 16. "Lulu's Bags Groove (1)" (バグス・グルーヴのルルちゃん その①, Bagusu Gurūvu no Ruru-chan Sono 1); 13. "'The Absurd Event That Happened to Me That Year'" ("その年わたしに起こった不条理な出来事", "Sono Toshi Watashi ni Okotta Fujōri na Dekigoto"); 14. "Hawaii State Land Registry Office" (ハワイ州土地登記所, Hawai-shū Tochi Tōkijo); 15. "Bigmouth Strikes Again" (ビッグマウス・ストライクス・アゲイン, Biggumausu Sutoraikusu Agein); 16. "That Girl's Bags Groove (1)" (あの娘のバグス・グルーヴ その①, Ano Musume no Bagusu Gurūvu Sono 1)
With the Lava Rock in hand, Jodio and his four teammates are given a new task: obtain documents from the Howler Company, a 50 billion-dollar infrastructure corporation based in Hawaii. Little does the team know that Howler and its agents are prepared for such a contingency.
5 (136)	"Deed" "Dīdo (Tochi Jōto Shōsho)" (『DEED（土地譲渡証書）』)	December 18, 2024	978-4-08-884298-1
17. "Lulu's Bags Groove (2)" (バグス・グルーヴのルルちゃん その②, Bagusu Gurūvu no Ruru-chan Sono 2); 18–20. "Lulu and Bobby Jean (1–3)" (ルルちゃんとボビー・ジーン その①〜③, Ruru-chan to Bobī Jīn Sono 1–3); 17–18. "That Girl's Bags Groove (2–3)" (あの娘のバグス・グルーヴ その②〜③, Ano Musume no Bagusu Gurūvu Sono 2–3); 19–20. "Glory Days (1–2)" (グローリー・デイズ その①〜②, Gurōrī Deizu Sono 1–2)
Howler Company's agents pursue the gang relentlessly as they rush to Pearl General Hospital. With one teammate down, it is only a matter of time before everyone has no choice but to fight.
6 (137)	"Board the Megayacht" "Megayotto ni Jōsen seyo" (『メガヨットに乗船せよ』)	July 17, 2025	978-4-08-884476-3
21. "Dolphin Bank Sales Manager Yokohama" (ドルフィン銀行営業本部長ヨコハマ, Dorufin Ginkō Eigyō Honbuchō Yokohama); 22. "Board the Megayacht" (メガヨットに乗船せよ, Megayotto ni Jōsen seyo); 23–24. "200 Balloons and Lyin' Eyes (1–2)" (200バルーンズと偽りの瞳 その①〜②, 200 Barūnzu to Itsuwari no Hitomi Sono 1–2); 21. "Howler Company Impropriety Suspicions" (HOWLER社不正疑惑, Haurā-sha Fusei Giwaku); 22–24. "Dolphin Bank's Debt Collection (1–3)" (ドルフィン銀行の取り立て その①〜③, Dorufin Ginkō no Toritate Sono 1–3)
After killing Bobby Jean and taking Lulu into captivity, Jodio's gang splits into two teams: one side backtracks to guard their base of operations, while the other boards Howler's yacht to directly pressure and con him out of his fortune. At the same time, Howler hires more agents to defend him on both fronts.
7 (138)	"Those Who Lurk in the Gaps" "Sukima ni Hisomu Monotachi" (『隙間に潜む者たち』)	December 18, 2025	978-4-08-884628-6
25–27. "200 Balloons and Lyin' Eyes (3–5)" (200バルーンズと偽りの瞳 その③〜⑤, 200 Barūnzu to Itsuwari no Hitomi Sono 3–5); 28. "Those Who Lurk in the Gaps, Part 1" (隙間に潜む者たち その①, Sukima ni Hisomu Mono-tachi Sono 1); 25. "Laem Chabang's Investigation" (レムチャバンの取り調べ, Remu Chaban no Torishirabe); 26–27. "Paco vs. Ningbo (1–2)" (パコvs寧波 その①〜②, Pako vs Ninbō Sono 1–2); 28. "Dignity and Instruction" (矜持と教示, Kyōji to Kyōji)
As the Dolphin Bank "employees" push the envelope in their haste to trick Howler into signing away his assets, the gang risks being backranked by Laem Chabang and Ningbo at their base of operations.
8 (139)	"System Reversal / Total Destruction" "Shisutemu Gyakuten Kanzen Hakai" (『システム逆転・完全破壊』)	March 19, 2026	978-4-08-884852-5
29–31. "Those Who Lurk in the Gaps (2–4)" (隙間に潜む者たち その②〜④, Sukima ni Hisomu Mono-tachi Sono 2–4); 32. "System Reversal / Total Destruction" (システム逆転・完全破壊, Shisutemu Gyakuten Kanzen Hakai); 29. "Lulu-Chan and Laem Chabang" (ルルちゃんとレムチャバン, Ruru-chan to Remu Chaban); 30–31. "West End Girl (1–2)" (ウエスト・エンド・ガール パート その①〜②, Uesuto Endo Gāru Sono 1–2); 32. "Sinking Howler" (沈みゆくハウラー, Shizumiyuku Haurā)
The Lava Rock is taken by the last of Howler's agents, forcing the team to go after it. Howler's suspicions render the land exchange all but hopeless; nevertheless, Jodio places his faith in the crumbling Lava Rock one last time.
9 (140)	"9 Months Later" "9-kagetsu tatte" (『9か月たって』)	September 17, 2026	978-4-08-885157-0
33. "9 Months Later" (9か月たって, 9-kagetsu tatte); 34–36. "Point Blank Seal (1–3) (ポイント・ブランク・シール その①〜③, Pointo Buranku Shīru Sono 1–3); 33–36. "Usagi, Fraud, and Suspicion (1–4)" (ウサギと詐欺と猜疑心 その①〜④, Usagi to Sagi to Saigishin Sono 1–4)
Nine months after Howler's disappearance, a new threat pops up—this time on the Internet. As it comes with people missing, Jodio and his friends realize they will need another Lava Rock to uncover this fraudulent operation.
10 (141)	— — (—)	December 17, 2026	978-4-08-885302-4

=== Chapters not in tankōbon format ===
The following chapters have not yet been released in collected tankōbon volumes:

- 37–38. "Usagi, Fraud, and Suspicion (5–6)" (ウサギと詐欺と猜疑心 その⑤〜⑥, Usagi to Sagi to Saigishin Sono 5–6)
- 39–41. "Underwater to the Island of Hawaii (1–3)" (ハワイ島は水面下で その①〜③, Hawai-tō wa Suimenka de Sono 1–3)

== Reception ==
Interest in the series' launch was enough to prompt a second printing of its debut issue of Ultra Jump – only the fourth time this had happened in Ultra Jump's history, and the first time in eleven years. The first tankōbon volume debuted at the top of Oricon's weekly Japanese sales charts for print comics, and was reported by Comic Natalie to have been the week's highest and fourth-highest selling comic at the bookstores Tsutaya and Comic Zin, respectively. The second volume was Shueisha's eleventh highest first print run manga volume of 2023–2024 (period from April 2023–March 2024), with 350,000 copies printed.

It ranked fifteenth, along with The Ramparts of Ice, on Takarajimasha's Kono Manga ga Sugoi! list of best manga of 2024 for male readers.
