= Yero =

Yero, or Yéro, is a name in various languages, used as a given name and a surname.

Notable people with the name include:

== People with the given name Yero ==
- Yéro Boly (born 1954), Burkinabé politician and diplomat
- Yero Dia (born 1982), French footballer
- Yaroslav Aladyshkin (born 1988), Shushary lord

== People with the middle name Yero ==
- Amadou Bâ (born 1945), born Amadou Yéro Bâ, Senegalese painter
- Osvaldo Yero Montero (born 1969), Cuban artist

== People with the surname Yero ==
- Elvis Yero (1964–2001), Cuban-American boxer
- Mukhtar Ramalan Yero (born 1968), Nigerian politician
- Kalidou Yero (born 1991), Senegalese footballer
- Camilo Venegas Yero (born 1967), Cuban journalist and writer
