= Giro =

Giro or GIRO may refer to:

== Banking and investments ==
- Giro (banking), a direct payment from one bank account to another instigated by the payer
- Girobank, a state owned and later privatised financial institution in the UK
- GiroBank, a Danish bank (1991–1995) which through several mergers is now part of Danske Bank
- name of a bank account with the Dutch Postgiro, later Postbank, now ING

== People ==
- Anna Girò, 18th-century Italian contralto
- Giro (singer) stage name of salsa singer Jorge López
- Ivelin Giro, Cuban American actress
- Jaume Giró (born 1964), Catalan corporate executive
- Maurice Giro (1932-2025), French politician
- Stefan Giro, Australian footballer

== Animals ==
- Giro (dog), (died 1934), dog owned by the German Ambassador to the United Kingdom, Leopold von Hoesch

== Places ==
- Giro, Indiana, a small town in the United States
- Giro District, Afghanistan

== Sport ==
- Giro d'Italia, a men's cycling Grand Tour in Italy
- Giro d'Italia Women, a women's cycling Grand Tour in Italy
- Giro d'Italia automobilistico, automobile race in Italy
- Giro (company), a U.S. manufacturer of helmets for cycling and snow sports

== Other uses ==
- Girò, an Italian wine grape
- Giró blanc, a Spanish wine grape
- Giro, or Girouette, a character in the video game Mega Man ZX
- Giro, a piece of orchestral music by Finnish composer Esa-Pekka Salonen

== See also ==
- Gyro (disambiguation)
