= Steel Ball Run =

2004–11 Japanese manga series

- First tankōbon volume cover, featuring Gyro Zeppeli and the depicted titular horse race over his hat

スティール・ボール・ラン (Sutīru Bōru Ran)
- Genre: Adventure; Supernatural; Western
- Manga
- Written by: Hirohiko Araki
- Published by: Shueisha
- English publisher: NA: Viz Media
- Imprint: Jump Comics
- Magazine: Weekly Shōnen Jump; (January 19 – October 16, 2004); Ultra Jump; (March 19, 2005 – April 19, 2011)
- Original run: January 19, 2004 – April 19, 2011
- Volumes: 24
- Other media
- Original net animation (2026–)
- Chronology
- Preceded by: Stone Ocean; Followed by: JoJolion
- icon

Steel Ball Run (Japanese: スティール・ボール・ラン, Hepburn: Sutīru Bōru Ran) (stylized in all caps when written in Latin script) is the seventh main story arc of the Japanese manga series JoJo's Bizarre Adventure, written and illustrated by Hirohiko Araki. Set in the United States in 1890, it follows the journey of Johnny Joestar, a paraplegic former jockey who desires to regain the use of his legs, and Gyro Zeppeli, a disgraced Neapolitan former executioner who seeks to win amnesty for a child on death row. They compete in the titular cross-country horse race for a $50 million grand prize, but find themselves targeted after discovering the hidden agenda of the race's sponsor.

The first 23 chapters were serialized in Shueisha's shōnen manga magazine Weekly Shōnen Jump in 2004 under the title of Steel Ball Run, seemingly without any connection to the JoJo's Bizarre Adventure series. However, when the series moved to seinen manga magazine Ultra Jump in 2005, Steel Ball Run was officially announced to be the seventh arc of JoJo's Bizarre Adventure, albeit set in a separate continuity from all the prior arcs. The new continuity that began in Steel Ball Run also serves as the setting for the following arcs of the series, JoJolion and The JoJoLands. Its 95 chapters were combined into 24 tankōbon volumes (volumes 81–104 of the entire series), following the trend set by the previous part, Stone Ocean, of starting over the volume count. Viz Media has licensed the manga for an English release in North America, with the first volume released in May 2025.

Steel Ball Run has been praised for its art, characters, and story. An anime adaptation, Steel Ball Run: JoJo's Bizarre Adventure, premiered on Netflix in March 2026.

== Plot ==
In September 1890, (Note: The universe in which Steel Ball Run and succeeding parts take place is not related to the first six parts in any way beyond references to the names of some of its characters and a scant few recycled Stands.) racing jockeys from all over the world flock to the United States to take part in the Steel Ball Run, a cross-country horse race from San Diego to New York City with a fifty-million dollar grand prize. A paraplegic named Johnny Joestar enters the race to learn about the mysterious Spin ability of a former Neapolitan executioner named Gyro Zeppeli, who temporarily restored Johnny's mobility after one of his steel balls hit Johnny. Although they begin the race as rivals, Johnny and Gyro become friends as they travel across the United States while fending off various assassins, terrorists, outlaws, and other violent competitors. Although the Steel Ball Run is organized by the eccentric promoter Steven Steel, United States President Funny Valentine has engineered the race to serve as a front for collecting the scattered pieces of a 1900-year-old corpse known as the Saint's Corpse (heavily implied to be the body of Jesus Christ). Valentine intends to reassemble the Corpse and gain limitless power through it on behalf of his nation, having already obtained the Corpse's heart.

After Johnny and Gyro encounter the left arm of the Saint's Corpse, it is absorbed into Johnny's body and he develops the evolving Stand, Tusk, allowing him to fend off one of Valentine's subordinates. Later, they meet the spiteful and ambitious racer Diego Brando who obtains the Corpse's left eye, while Gyro gains the right eye. Johnny and Gyro continue the race, encountering other racers, gaining and losing Corpse parts, and enhancing their Spin techniques along the way. Eventually, Valentine succeeds in taking Johnny and Gyro's corpse parts, seizing Diego's eye soon afterward with the aid of his dimension-traversing Stand, Dirty Deeds Done Dirt Cheap (often shortened as "D4C").

Meanwhile, Steven's wife Lucy tries to uncover and foil Valentine's plan with later assistance from another racer, Hot Pants. However, Valentine discovers Lucy and takes her captive after she fuses with the Corpse and becomes pregnant with the Corpse's head. Diego and Hot Pants ally against and fight Valentine on a moving train, but are overpowered and killed by the president. Lucy begins to merge with the completed Corpse fully, enhancing Valentine's stand with a new misfortune-redirecting ability known as D4C: Love Train. Johnny and Gyro arrive and attempt to battle the seemingly invulnerable Valentine, only for Valentine to overpower them both and kill Gyro. Mourning his mentor and friend, Johnny realizes how to achieve the perfect form of the Spin technique, enhancing his Stand and overwhelming Valentine with his new power. Valentine attempts to feign surrender, and offers to “bring back” Gyro using D4C's trans-dimensional abilities. Valentine draws a gun on Johnny, but Johnny kills him, avenging Gyro, but putting an end to any hope of his return.

The Saint's Corpse separates from Lucy, only to be stolen by an unknown antagonist. Pursuing the thief into the final stage of the Steel Ball Run, Johnny is shocked to find that it is an alternate instance of Diego Brando taken from a parallel dimension by Valentine, wielding a time-stopping Stand known as The World. Johnny attempts to engage the alternate Diego, who defeats him with his own attack and easily takes first place in the race. The alternate Diego brings the Corpse to Trinity Church, only to run into Lucy, who annihilates him by forcing him to merge with the severed head of the original Diego.

As the race ends, the alternate Diego is disqualified after failing to appear for post-race ceremonies, so first place is awarded to the carefree Pocoloco, who had slept through the start of the race and only caught up by sheer luck, while Steven Steel arrives to save Johnny. Valentine's death is covered up as retirement from public life, with concerns over the race placated by the donation of the race's revenue to charitable causes. Johnny, having regained his ability to walk through the power of his Stand and the Spin, leaves America to return Gyro's body to his family. On the boat, he meets the Japanese runner-up racer Norisuke Higashikata. Johnny later marries Norisuke's daughter Rina, leading to the events of Part 8, JoJolion.

== Characters ==
- Johnny Joestar, (Note: Johnny Joestar (ジョニィ・ジョースター, Jonī Jōsutā)) born Jonathan Joestar, is a former horse racer from Danville, Kentucky, who is paralyzed from the waist down. He participates in the Steel Ball Run to follow Gyro Zeppeli in the hopes of using his Spin technique to regain use of his legs. He uses the Stand Tusk, (Note: Tusk (牙(タスク), Tasuku)) which allows him to shoot his finger nails as bullets. As the race continues and Johnny begins to understand the Spin, Tusk evolves into different forms, termed ACTs, with differing capabilities, similarly to Koichi Hirose's Echoes.
- Gyro Zeppeli, (Note: Gyro Zeppeli (ジャイロ・ツェペリ, Jairo Tseperi)) born Julius Caesar Zeppeli, (Note: Julius Caesar Zeppeli (ユーリウス・カイザー・ツェペリ, Yūriusu Kaizā Tseperi)) is a disgraced magistrate and executioner from the Kingdom of Naples, who participates in the Steel Ball Run to free a boy on death row who he believes has been wrongfully convicted. He is a master of a mystical art called the Spin, which channels rotational energy through Steel Balls to produce all manner of effects. Gyro has an acute knowledge of the human body, which combines with his precision, quick judgment, and knowledge of Spin to make him a skilled combatant. Gyro eventually unlocks the Stand-like Spin technique Ball Breaker, (Note: Ball Breaker (ボール・ブレイカー, Bōru Bureikā)) which allows him to induce senescence in whatever his Steel Balls hit.
- Lucy Steel (Note: Lucy Steel (ルーシー・スティール, Rūshī Sutīru)) is a fourteen-year-old girl married to Steel Ball Run promoter Steven Steel. (Note: Steven Steel (スティーブン・スティール, Sutībun Sutīru)) Steven took the original idea for the Steel Ball Run from Lucy, and later married her both out of gratitude and to save her and her father from the Mafia. After learning of the Holy Corpse, Lucy allies herself with Johnny and Gyro to put an end to the president's ambitions. She later obtains the Stand Ticket to Ride, (Note: Ticket to Ride (涙の乗車券(チケット・ゥ・ライド), Chikettu Raido; "Ticket of Tears" in English releases)) which allows her tears to take solid form and alter the luck of whatever they touch, before eventually being forced to fuse with the Corpse itself.
- Diego Brando, (Note: Diego Brando (ディエゴ・ブランドー, Diego Burandō)) nicknamed Dio, (Note: Dio (Dio(ディオ), Dio)) is a Steel Ball Run participant from the United Kingdom, and one of Johnny and Gyro's fiercest rivals. After being transformed into a dinosaur by Dr. Ferdinand's Stand Scary Monsters, (Note: Scary Monsters (スケアリー・モンスターズ, Sukearī Monsutāzu; "Frightening Monsters" in English releases)) he inherits the ability for himself by seizing the Holy Corpse's left eye. Diego utilizes Scary Monsters more directly than his predecessor, often partially turning himself into a dinosaur or using miniature dinosaurs to pursue his targets.
- Hot Pants (Note: Hot Pants (ホット・パンツ, Hotto Pantsu)) is a Steel Ball Run participant from the United States. Having sacrificed her younger brother to escape a grizzly bear in her youth, Hot Pants became a nun to atone for her sins before eventually entering the race. She uses the Stand Cream Starter, (Note: Cream Starter (クリーム・スターター, Kurīmu Sutātā)) which takes the form of a spray bottle that can spray human flesh as a foam-like substance that can fuse with people's bodies.
- Wekapipo (Note: Wekapipo (ウェカピポ, Wekapipo)) is a former Neapolitan royal guard who was exiled for killing his sister's abusive husband in a duel. He is hired by Funny Valentine alongside Stand user Magent Magent to attack Johnny and Gyro. Like Gyro, Wekapipo is not a Stand User, but instead uses Steel Balls imbued with the Spin. His special technique, referred to as Wrecking Ball, (Note: Wrecking Ball (レッキング・ボール (壊れゆく鉄球), Rekkingu Bōru (Kowareyuku Tekkyū))) allows him to release smaller spheres from one of his Steel Balls if it is blocked or misses, which cause anyone who touches them to become unable to see or feel anything to their left side.
- Mountain Tim (Note: Mountain Tim (マウンテン・ティム, Maunten Timu)) is a cowboy and bounty hunter introduced as a leading competitor in the Steel Ball Run. During the first stages of the race, Tim becomes one of Johnny and Gyro's allies while pursuing a murderous competitor. Later, Tim returns to save Lucy after she infiltrates a government building, out of his own romantic feelings for her. Mountain Tim is a Stand User who is able to transport his body through his lasso thanks to his Stand, Oh! Lonesome Me. (Note: Oh! Lonesome Me (オー！ロンサム・ミー, Ō! Ronsamu Mī; "Lasso Blues" in English releases))
- Pocoloco (Note: Pocoloco (ポコロコ, Pokoroko)) joins the race after a fortune-teller foretells great luck in his immediate future. Through that sheer luck, he becomes one of the fiercest competitors of the race. Though Pocoloco is a Stand User, his Stand, Hey Ya!, (Note: Hey Ya! (ヘイ・ヤー, Hei Yā; "Hey Yo!" in English releases)) only demonstrates the ability to encourage and suggest ideas to him, relying upon his natural luck.
- Sandman, (Note: Sandman (サンドマン, Sandoman; "Sand Man" in English releases)) whose real name translates to Soundman, (Note: Soundman (サウンドマン, Saundoman; "Sound Man" in English releases)) is a competitor in the Steel Ball Run race. Sandman comes from a Native American tribe in the Arizona desert. Despite being ostracized for adopting the ways of American society, he hopes that winning the race will earn him enough money to buy back his ancestors' land. In addition to becoming one of the fiercest competitors in the race thanks to his running technique, Sandman wields the Stand In a Silent Way, (Note: In a Silent Way (イン・ア・サイレント・ウェイ, In A Sairento Wei; "Silent Ways" in English releases)) which allows him to create three-dimensional constructs out of sounds and apply their associated effects to whatever they touch. He is eventually hired by Funny Valentine and partnered with Diego Brando, with orders to assassinate Johnny and Gyro.
- Funny Valentine (Note: Funny Valentine (ファニー・ヴァレンタイン, Fanī Varentain)) is the 23rd President of the United States, and a former soldier. He uses the Stand Dirty Deeds Done Dirt Cheap, (Note: Dirty Deeds Done Dirt Cheap (Dirty deeds done dirt cheap(ダーティー・ディーズ・ダン・ダート・チープ)（いともたやすく行われるえげつない行為）, Dātī Dīzu Dan Dāto Chīpu (Itomo Tayasuku Okonawareru Egetsunai Kōi; "Devilish Deeds Done Damned Coldly" in English releases), commonly shortened to D4C (D4C(ディー・フォー・シー), Dī Fō Shī)) which allows him to travel or send things between alternate dimensions when pressed or positioned between two objects, with any counterparts in the same dimension being forced to merge with each other and be destroyed. Valentine later acquires an additional ability named D4C Love Train, (Note: D4C Love Train (D4C(ディー・フォー・シー) -ラブトレイン-, Dī Fō Shī -Rabu Torein-; "D4C: Love Caravan" in English releases)) which produces a gap in space that redirects any attack toward Valentine to somewhere else in the world.
- The Boomboom Family are a family of criminals pursuing a bounty for Gyro's death. At the beginning of the race, they kill several competitors, attracting the attention of Mountain Tim. The family shares a single Stand, Tomb of the Boom, (Note: Tomb of the Boom (トゥーム・オブ・ザ・ブーム, Tūmu Obu Za Būmu; "Tomb of the Noise" in English releases)) which manipulates magnetism within whoever and whatever they touch.
  - Benjamin Boomboom (Note: Benjamin Boomboom (ベンジャミン・ブンブーン, Benjamin Bunbūn; "Benny Boomboom" in English releases)) is the patriarch and leader of the family, his wife having left the family to work as a prostitute. He is murderous and greedy, and he and his two sons kill several racers in the early stages of the race. Benjamin uses Tomb of the Boom to sink metal objects into his skin, which he can disguise himself with or release to attack unsuspecting victims.
  - Andre Boomboom (Note: Andre Boomboom (アンドレ・ブンブーン, Andore Bunbūn; "Andrew Boomboom" in English releases)) is one of Benjamin's two sons and displays the same murderous tendencies as his father, in addition to a deep fascination with erotic asphyxiation. Andre uses Tomb of the Boom to turn his victims into living magnets, allowing him to both impale them with surrounding objects and materialize sharp objects from within them.
  - L.A. Boomboom (Note: L.A. Boomboom (Ｌ.Ａ. ブンブーン, Eru Ē Bunbūn; "Laurence Boomboom" in English releases)) is the youngest and least knowledgeable of the family, lacking basic mathematical skills and suffering constant verbal abuse from his father and brother. L.A. uses Tomb of the Boom to immobilize enemies using iron sand and extract the iron from their blood.
- Valentine's Subordinates are Stand Users who support president Funny Valentine's ambitions of obtaining the Holy Corpse, with most coming into conflict with Johnny and Gyro over a part of the coveted relic.
  - Oyecomova (Note: Oyecomova (オエコモバ, Oekomoba; "Oye" in English releases)) is a terrorist from the Kingdom of Naples who participates in the Steel Ball Run. Having heard of Gyro Zeppeli's participation, he attacks Gyro in the Rocky Mountains as revenge against his home country's king. Oyecomova uses the stand Listen to My Rhythm, (Note: Listen to My Rhythm (ボクのリズムを聴いてくれ, Boku no Rhythm wo Kiitekure; "Tic Tac Boom" in English releases)) which allows him to create and attach timed automatic grenades to anything he touches.
  - Pork Pie Hat Kid (Note: Pork Pie Hat Kid (ポーク・パイ・ハット小僧, Pōku Pai Hatto Kozō; "Bamboo Hat Kid" in English releases)) is a deranged young boy hired by Valentine to find the Corpse's left arm. His Stand, Wired, (Note: Wired (ワイアード, Waiādo; "Roped" in English releases)) allows him to release two hooks from his mouth, which can hook, attack, and reel in targets through any body of water.
  - Dr. Ferdinand (Note: Dr. Ferdinand (フェルディナンド博士, Ferudinando-hakase)) is a geologist hired by Funny Valentine to attack Gyro and Johnny in the Rocky Mountains. Ferdinand carries the belief that the Earth brings prosperity to those who respect it, claiming that the dinosaurs were wiped out due to their lack of respect for the planet. Fittingly, he is the original user of the Stand Scary Monsters, which gives him the ability to turn living beings into dinosaurs under his command.
  - Ringo Roadagain (Note: Ringo Roadagain (リンゴォ・ロードアゲイン, Ringō Rōdoagein)) is a solitary gunslinger hired by Funny Valentine to attack the racers in hopes of obtaining their parts of the Holy Corpse. In his youth, Ringo's family was murdered by a man who Ringo barely managed to kill, an act that inspired Ringo to continue growing spiritually and enter into "the world of man" by dueling others. Ringo uses the Stand Mandom, (Note: Mandom (マンダム, Mandamu; "Mando" in English releases)) which allows him to rewind time by six seconds by adjusting his watch.
  - Blackmore, (Note: Blackmore (ブラックモア, Burakkomoa; "Darkmore" in English releases)) one of the president's bodyguards, is tasked with tracking and eliminating an unknown intruder. Blackmore's wearable Stand, Catch the Rainbow, (Note: Catch the Rainbow (キャッチ・ザ・レインボー, Kyatchi Za Reinbō; "Stroboscope" in English releases)) lets him interact with falling raindrops as if they were solid, allowing him to use them as projectiles, walk atop the falling rain, and even seal his own wounds.
  - The Eleven Men (Note: Eleven Men (１１人の男たち, Jūichi-nin no Otoko-tachi)) are assassins hired by Valentine to kill Johnny and Gyro in order to obtain their parts of the Holy Corpse. The entire group shares a single Stand, Tattoo You!, (Note: Tatoo You! (TATOO(タトゥー) YOU(ユー)！, Tatū Yū!; "Man in Tatoo" in English releases)) which allows each of the eleven members to phase into and hide inside their comrades.
  - Mike O. (Note: Mike O. (マイク・オー, Maiku Ō)) is Funny Valentine's personal bodyguard. When Lucy Steel and Hot Pants infiltrate the President's residence in Chicago, he battles Hot Pants in order to protect Valentine. His Stand, Tubular Bells, (Note: Tubular Bells (チューブラー・ベルズ, Chūburā Beruzu; "Tubular" in English releases)) allows him to create sentient balloon dogs out of metal that pursue and burrow into a specific target.
  - Magent Magent (Note: Magent Magent (マジェント・マジェント, Majento Majento)) is deployed alongside Wekapipo to attack Johnny and Gyro near Lake Michigan. After being incapacitated and losing an eye, he returns to civilization to attack Steven Steel, prompting a duel with his former partner. Magent Magent wields the Stand 20th Century Boy, (Note: 20th Century Boy (20th Century BOY(トウェンティース・センチュリー・ボーイ), Towentīsu Senchurī Bōi; "Millesimal Boy" in English releases)) which allows him to transfer any damage or affliction he faces into the ground while he is in a squatting position.
  - Axl RO (Note: Axl RO (アクセル・RO, Akuseru Rō; "Axl" in English releases)) is a veteran of the American Civil War and an agent of President Valentine. Having failed to raise an alarm for his troops in a crucial battle during the war, Axl RO attacks Hot Pants, Gyro, and Johnny near Gettysburg, Pennsylvania to cleanse himself of his longstanding guilt and steal the near-complete Holy Corpse. Axl is the Stand User of Civil War, (Note: Civil War (シビル・ウォー, Shibiru Wō; "The Abandoned" in English releases)) a Stand that revives the subjects of its victims' guilt in physical form, up to and including its own user.
  - D-I-S-C-O is an agent of Funny Valentine who is sent to distract Gyro from Johnny's attempted assassination. D-I-S-C-O wields the stand Chocolate Disco, (Note: Chocolate Disco (チョコレート・ディスコ, Chokorēto Disuko)) which allows him to teleport objects around a grid projected onto the ground in front of him.
  - Following his defeat at Johnny's hands, Valentine summons an alternate Diego Brando from a parallel dimension in the hopes of defeating Johnny, securing the Holy Corpse, and bestowing his country with eternal prosperity. Despite having a similar personality and ruthlessness to his counterpart, the alternate Diego firmly allies himself with the late president and meticulously arranges a plan to eliminate his rival for good. The alternate Diego wields the invincible Stand The World, (Note: The World (THE WORLD(ザ・ワールド), Za Wārudo)) which possesses the ability to stop time for everyone except its user for around five seconds.
- Sugar Mountain (Note: Sugar Mountain (シュガー・マウンテンの泉, Shugā Maunten no Izumi; lit. 'Sugar Mountain's Spring'; 'Snow Mountain's Spring' in English releases)) is a large tree near Milwaukee that serves as its own Stand and user. Those who drop anything near the tree will be met by a guardian bearing the same name as the tree, who will offer a choice between the dropped item and one of greater value (akin to the fable of The Honest Woodcutter). While liars meet an immediate end at the tree's hands, honest people face a second trial after departing: if the unfortunate party fails to trade, consume, or otherwise use up everything they obtained from the tree by sunset, they are absorbed into the tree itself and forced to serve as one of its rotating guardians.

== Production ==
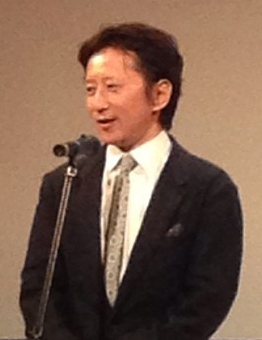
The series was written and illustrated by Hirohiko Araki

Written and illustrated by Hirohiko Araki, Steel Ball Run was originally serialized in Shueisha's shōnen manga anthology Weekly Shōnen Jump from January 19 to October 16, 2004. It was later moved to Shueisha's monthly seinen magazine Ultra Jump on March 19, 2005, and ran until April 19, 2011. Araki found that the new, monthly schedule with longer chapters suited him better, as he was not as restricted in what he could draw and no longer had to write stories with momentum building up excitement for the next week's chapter, and had more flexibility to draw at his own pace. Araki described the manga's theme as "seeking for satisfaction". Like with other parts of JoJo's Bizarre Adventure, Araki also used "an affirmation that humanity is wonderful" as a theme, which he explained as a description for humanity's ability to grow and overcome hardships through one's strength and spirit, portrayed through people succeeding in fights through their own actions, without relying on machines or gods.

Because the series follows a race across America, Araki had to split his research into three trips: one from the West Coast to the deserts, one from the Great Plains to the Mississippi River and Chicago, and one to New York. He said that it would have been impossible to get an understanding for the vast scale without having gone there personally, describing the scenery of the Midwest as endless and unchanging. The feeling of distance made him think that if an enemy had approached, the open landscape would have meant that he could not have escaped due to a lack of places to hide, an experience he found useful when drawing the manga.

Like other protagonists in the series, Johnny was designed to symbolize the part's story and setting, and to stand out among the previous protagonists in terms of appearance, clothing, and silhouette. He was not specifically planned to have a disability at the start of the production; rather, his disability was the result of the series' focus on protagonists growing through overcoming hardships, and Araki wanting to create a character who was forced to rely on people and horses during the race and had room to grow both mentally and physically. Valentine was created as part of Araki noticing more and more that good and evil is not always easily distinguishable and taking a greater interest in the motivations for people who do bad things. He noted that Valentine's patriotism and goals seemed just and might align with those of leaders in the real world, and that it is his exploitation of powerless people to reach his goals that makes him evil and completely unsuitable as a protagonist. The concept of having the United States president fighting the main characters came from when Araki saw the film Independence Day, and liked the idea of a president who fights.

== Chapters ==
=== Original volumization (Jump Comics) ===
The first chapter title of each pair is the title that is used in the volumization of Steel Ball Run. The second title is the title used in the original serialization in Weekly Shonen Jump and Ultra Jump.

No.	Title	Japanese release date	Japanese ISBN
1 (81)	September 25, 1890: San Diego Beach; Sen Happyaku Kyūjū Nen Kugatsu Nijūgonichi San Diego Bīchi (1890年9月25日 サンディエゴビーチ)	May 20, 2004	4-08-873601-X
1. "Steel Ball Run: The Press Conference" (スティール・ボール・ラン 記者会見, Sutīru Bōru Ran Kisha Kaiken); 2. "Gyro Zeppeli" (ジャイロ・ツェペリ, Jairo Tseperi); 3. "Johnny Joestar" (ジョニィ・ジョースター, Jonī Jōsutā); 4. "September 25, 1890: Three Hours Before the Start" (1890年9月25日 スタート3時間前, Sen Happyaku Kyūjū Nen Kugatsu Nijūgonichi Sutāto San Jikan Mae); 5. "First Stage: 15,000 Meters" (1st. STAGE 15,000メートル, Fāsuto Sutēji Ichiman Gosen Mētoru); 1-3. "San Diego Beach, September 23, 1890: Two Days Before the Start (1-3)" (サンディエゴビーチ 1890年9月23日 スタート2日前 その①〜③, San Diego Bīchi Sen Happyaku Kyūjū Nen Kugatsu Nijūsanichi Sutāto Futsuka Mae Sono 1-3); 4. "San Diego Beach, September 23, 1890: The Start" (サンディエゴビーチ 9月25日 スタート, San Diego Bīchi Kugatsu Nijūgonichi Sutāto); 5. "15,000 Meters: Hill Area, 10 A.M." (15,000メートル 丘陵地帯 午前10時, Ichiman Gosen Mētoru Kyūryō Chitai Gozen Jūji)
Gyro Zeppeli, master of an art known as the Spin, signs up to participate in the trans-continental Steel Ball Run horseback race in America. A chance encounter with paraplegic jockey Johnny Joestar causes the latter's legs to move for a moment, spurring him to enter the race and discover Gyro's secret.
2 (82)	First Stage: 15,000 Meters; Fāsuto Sutēji Ichiman Gosen Mētoru (1st. STAGE 15,000メートル)	May 20, 2004	4-08-873613-3
6. "The Arroyo and Diego Brando" (涸れた川；ディエゴ・ブランドー, Kareta Kawa; Diego Burandō; lit. 'The Dried-Up River; Diego Brando'); 7. "Pocoloco and Sandman" (ポコロコとサンドマン, Pokoroko to Sandoman); 8. "Into the Grove" (雑木林越え, Zōkibayashi Goe); 9. "The Long, Long Road Down" (長い長い下り坂, Nagai Nagai Kudarizaka); 10. "The Final Stretch: 2,000 Meters to Go" (最終直線 残り2,000メートル, Saishū Chokusen Nokori Nisen Mētoru); 11. "The Final Stretch: 1,000 Meters to Go" (最終直線 残り1,000メートル, Saishū Chokusen Nokori Sen Mētoru); "The Tale of How the Steel Ball Run Came to Be" (スティール・ボール・ラン レース開催のいきさつ, Stīu Bōru Ran Rēsu Kaisai no Ikisatsu) (Note: Steel Ball Run: How the Race Got Started, The Story of F. Valentine, and chapter 63 were only released in the volumization of Steel Ball Run.); 6. "15,000 Meters: The Dried-Up River, 10:05 A.M." (15,000メートル 涸れた川 午前10時5分, Ichiman Gosen Mētoru Kareta Kawa Gozen Jūji Gofun); 7. "15,000 Meters: Uphill, 10:08 A.M." (15,000メートル 登り坂 午前10時8分, 15,000 Mētoru Noborizaka Gozen Jūji Happun); 8. "15,000 Meters: The Grove, 10:12 A.M." (15,000メートル 雑木林 午前10時12分, Ichiman Gosen Mētoru Zōkibayashi Gozen Jūji Jūnifun); 9. "15,000 Meters: The Road Down, 10:14 A.M." (15,000メートル 下り坂 午前10時14分, Ichiman Gosen Mētoru Kudarizaka Gozen Jūji Jūyonpun); 10. "15,000 Meters: The Final Stretch, 10:17 A.M." (15,000メートル 最終直線 午前10時17分, Ichiman Gosen Mētoru Saishū Chokusen Gozen Jūji Jūnanafun); 11. "15,000 Meters: Before the Goal, 10:18 A.M." (15,000メートル ゴール前 午前10時18分, Ichiman Gosen Mētoru Gōru Mae Gozen Jūji Jūhappun)
The first stage of the race nears its conclusion. Gyro's Spin is pitted against British jockey Diego Brando's cunning, Native American Sandman's running technique, and sharecropper Pocoloco's supernatural luck.
3 (83)	Second Stage: Arizona Desert Crossing; Sekando Sutēji Arizona Sabaku Goe (2nd. STAGE アリゾナ砂漠越え)	November 4, 2004	4-08-873673-7
12. "First Stage: Disqualified Victory" (1st. STAGE 優勝失格, Fāsuto Sutēji Yūshō Shikaku); 13. "The Sheriff's Request to Mountain Tim" (保安官 マウンテン・ティムへの依頼, Hoankan Maunten Timu e no Irai); 14. "Arizona Desert Crossing: The Shortest Route" (アリゾナ砂漠越え 最短ルートを進め, Arizona Sabaku Goe Saitan Rūto o Susume); 15-17. "The Desert-Born Outlaws (1-3)" (砂漠で生まれたならず者 その①〜③, Sabaku de Umareta Narazumono Sono 1-3); 12. "First Stage: Order of Arrival Confirmed" (1st.STAGE 着順確定, Fāsuto Sutēji Chaku Jun Kakutei); 13. "Second Stage: The Start" (2nd.STAGEスタート, Sekando Sutēji Sutāto); 14. "Mrs. Robinson" (ミセス・ロビンスン, Misesu Robinson); 15. "Andre Boomboom" (アンドレ・ブンブーン, Andore Bunbūn); 16. "The Boomboom Family" (ブンブーン一家, Bunbūn Ikka); 17. "Mountain Tim" (マウンテン・ティム, Maunten Timu)
As bounty hunter Mountain Tim pursues a mysterious murderer, Gyro and Johnny are attacked by a family of enemies with supernatural abilities in the race's second stage.
4 (84)	Gyro Zeppeli's Destiny; Jairo Tseperi no Shukumei (ジャイロ・ツェペリの宿命)	November 4, 2004	4-08-873689-3
18-19. "The Devil's Palm (1-2)" (悪魔の手のひら その①〜②, Akuma no Tenohira Sono 1-2); 20-21. "Gyro Zeppeli's Destiny (1-2)" (ジャイロ・ツェペリの宿命 その①〜②, Jairo Tseperi no Shukumei Sono 1-2); 22-23. "The Terrorist from a Faraway Country (1-2)" (遠い国から来たテロリスト その①〜②, Tōi Kuni kara Kita Terorisuto Sono 1-2); 18. "A Three-Way Battle" (3人の闘い, Sannin no Tatakai); 19. "A Cursed Power" (呪われた能力, Norowareta Chikara); 20. "The Zeppeli Family" (ツェペリ一族, Tseperi Ichizoku); 21. "Relay Point" (中継地点, Chūkei Chiten); 22. "Bombing in the Desert" (砂漠の猛爆, Sabaku no Mōbaku); 23. "Chase in the Mountains" (山岳地帯の追撃, Sangaku Chitai no Tsuigeki)
As Gyro and Johnny fend off their attackers with help from Mountain Tim, Johnny begins to develop an ability of his own. Later, a terrorist from Gyro's home country assaults him and Johnny.
5 (85)	The President's Conspiracy; Daitōryō no Inbō (大統領の陰謀)	August 4, 2005	4-08-873845-4
24. "Interlude" (インタールード (間奏曲), Intārūdo (Kansōkyoku)); 25-27. "Tusk (1-3)" (牙(タスク) その①〜③, Tasuku Sono 1-3); 24. "Prologue" (プロローグ編, Purorōgu-hen); 25-27. "The President's Orders: 'Find the Corpse!' (1-3)" (大統領命令「死体をさがせ」①〜③, Daitōryō Meirei 'Shitai o Sagase' 1-3)
Gyro disappears as the result of an enemy attack. In the ensuing battle, Johnny's Stand ability fully awakens, and the race's purpose as a front to gather a holy corpse is revealed.
6 (86)	Scary Monsters; Sukearī Monsutāzu (スケアリー モンスターズ)	November 4, 2005	4-08-873890-X
28-30. "Scary Monsters (1-3)" (スケアリー モンスターズ その①〜③, Sukearī Monsutāzu Sono 1-3); "The Story of Funny Valentine" (ザストーリーオブファニー・ヴァレンタイン, Za Sutōri Obu Fanī Varentain; lit. 'The Story of Funny Valentine'); 28-30. "Diego Brando (1-3)" (ディエゴ・ブランドー①〜③, Diego Burandō 1-3)
The second stage ends and the third begins. Gyro, Johnny, and Diego decide to rest in a village along their route, only to discover that the residents have turned into dinosaurs.
7 (87)	A Little Gravestone on the Wide, Wide Prairie; Hiroi Hiroi Daisōgen no Chīsana Bohyō (広い広い大草原の小さな墓標)	March 3, 2006	4-08-874117-X
31. "Scary Monsters (4)" (スケアリー モンスターズ その④, Sukearī Monsutāzu Sono 4); 32. "Third Stage Finish Line: Cañon City" (3rd. STAGE ゴール．キャノン・シティ, Sādo Sutēji Gōru: Kyanon Shiti); 33. "A Man's World (1)" (男の世界 その①, Otoko no Sekai Sono 1); 31. "Diego Brando (4)" (ディエゴ・ブランドー④, Diego Burandō 4); 32. "Cross the Lake" (湖を越えろ, Mizuumi o Koero); 33. "Little Gravestone on the Prairie (1)" (大草原の小さな墓標①, Dai Sōgen no Chīsana Bohyō 1)
Though the leader of the dinosaurs is defeated, Diego manages to retain part of their ability. The three jockeys race toward the end of the third stage.
8 (88)	To a Man's World; Otoko no Sekai e (男の世界へ)	May 2, 2006	4-08-874119-6
34-35. "A Man's World (2-3)" (男の世界 その②〜③, Otoko no Sekai Sono 2-3); 36. "The Green Gravestone (1)" (緑色の墓標 その①, Midori-iro no Bohyō Sono 1); 34-35. "Little Gravestone on the Prairie (2-3)" (大草原の小さな墓標②〜③, Dai Sōgen no Chīsana Bohyō 2-3); 36. "Lucy Steel" (ルーシー・スティール, Rūshī Sutīru)
The fourth stage of the race begins. Johnny, Gyro, and fellow racer Hot Pants are trapped in a forest by duel-seeking gunslinger Ringo Roadagain, who possesses the power to rewind time.
9 (89)	One Stormy Night Is Coming; Arashi no Yoru ga Yatte Kuru (嵐の夜がやってくる)	September 4, 2006	4-08-874147-1
37. "The Green Gravestone (2)" (緑色の墓標 その②, Midori-iro no Bohyō Sono 2); 38-39. "Catch the Rainbow (One Stormy Night...) (1-2)" (キャッチ・ザ・レインボー（嵐の夜に…） その①〜②, Kyatchi Za Reinbō (Arashi no Yoru ni...) Sono 1-2); 37-39. "The Little Green Gravestone (1-3)" (緑色の小さな墓標①〜③, Midori-iro no Chīsana Bohyō 1-3)
Lucy Steel, the wife of race organizer Steven Steel, learns of president Funny Valentine's intentions for the race, and that he carries the corpse's heart. After intercepting a message for the president, Lucy is hunted down by one of Valentine's henchmen.
10 (90)	Illinois Skyline, Michigan Lakeline; Irinoi Sukairain Mishigan Reikurain (イリノイ・スカイライン ミシガン・レイクライン)	November 2, 2006	4-08-874285-0
40-42. "Silent Way (1-3)" (サイレント・ウェイ その①〜③, Sairento Wei Sono 1-3); 40. "Lucy's Determination" (ルーシーの決意, Rūshī no Ketsui); 41. "Which One Is the Enemy?" (敵はどいつだ？, Teki wa Doitsu da?); 42. "A Further Stage" (さらなる段階, Saranaru Dankai)
Gyro and Lucy plot to steal the corpse's heart from the president. Later, during the fifth stage, Sandman turns on Johnny and Gyro and attacks them with his own Stand.
11 (91)	Make the Golden Rectangle! Ōgon Chōhōkei o Tsukure! (黄金長方形をつくれ!)	March 2, 2007	978-4-08-874336-3
43-44. "Silent Way (4-5)" (サイレント・ウェイ その④〜⑤, Sairento Wei Sono 4-5); 45. "The Promised Land: Sugar Mountain (1)" (約束の地 シュガー・マウンテン その①, Yakusoku no Chi Shugā Maunten Sono 1); 43. "The Golden Rectangle" (黄金長方形, Ōgon Chōhōkei); 44. "To the Golden Spin!" (黄金の回転へ！, Ōgon no Kaiten e!); 45. "Rules of the Lakeside" (湖畔のルール, Kohan no Rūru)
Johnny's Stand evolves thanks to Gyro's advice to harness the golden ratio, and the battle with Sandman reaches its conclusion. Soon afterward, during the race's sixth stage, Gyro and Johnny are gifted two parts of the corpse from a cursed tree.
12 (92)	Conditions for the Corpse, Conditions for Friendship; Itai e no Jōken Yūjō e no Jōken (遺体への条件 友情への条件)	May 2, 2007	978-4-08-874362-2
46-47. "The Promised Land: Sugar Mountain (2-3)" (約束の地 シュガー・マウンテン その②〜③, Yakusoku no Chi Shugā Maunten Sono 2-3); 48. "Tubular Bells (1)" (チューブラー・ベルズ その①, Chūburā Beruzu Sono 1); 46-48. "Rules of the Lakeside (2-4)" (湖畔のルール②〜④, Kohan no Rūru 2-4)
Johnny and Gyro struggle to fight off Valentine's henchmen and use up their gifts before they are absorbed into the tree.
13 (93)	Steel Balls Breaking; Kowareyuku Tekkyū (壊れゆく鉄球)	September 4, 2007	978-4-08-874420-9
49-50. "Tubular Bells (2-3)" (チューブラー・ベルズ その②〜③, Chūburā Beruzu Sono 2-3); 51. "Steel Balls Breaking: Wrecking Ball (1)" (壊れゆく鉄球 レッキング・ボール その①, Kowareyuku Tekkyū Rekkingu Bōru Sono 1); 49-50. "War at the President's Residence (1-2)" (政府公邸の攻防①〜②, Seifu Kōtei no Kōbō 1-2); 51. "Steel Ball vs. Steel Ball" (鉄球VS鉄球, Tekkyū Bāsasu Tekkyū)
Lucy befriends the president's wife to infiltrate his mansion, only to be attacked by the president's bodyguard.
14 (94)	What It Takes to Be a Winner; Shōrisha e no Shikaku (勝利者への資格)	December 4, 2007	978-4-08-874438-4
52-54. "Steel Balls Breaking: Wrecking Ball (2-4)" (壊れゆく鉄球 レッキング・ボール その②〜④, Kowareyuku Tekkyū Rekkingu Bōru Sono 2-4); 55. "What It Takes to Be a Winner" (勝利者への資格, Shōrisha e no Shikaku); 52. "A World of Ice" (氷の世界, Kōri no Sekai); 53. "Wekapipo's Method" (ウェカピポのやり方, Wekapipo no Yarikata); 54. "Wekapipo is Coming!" (ウェカピポが来る！, Wekapipo ga Kuru!); 55. "The Sixth Finish Line" (6度目のゴール, Roku Do Me no Gōru)
Gyro and Johnny are attacked by the duo of rival Spin user Wekapipo and his partner Magent Magent.
15 (95)	A Dream of Gettysburg; Getisubāgu no Yume (ゲティスバーグの夢)	May 2, 2008	978-4-08-874518-3
56-58. "Civil War (1-3)" (シビル・ウォー その①〜③, Shibiru Wō Sono 1-3); 59. "A Dream of Gettysburg" (ゲティスバーグの夢, Getisubāgu no Yume); 56-59. "House of Recollection (1-4)" (追憶の館①〜④, Tsuioku no Kan 1-4)
During the seventh stage, Johnny and Gyro are attacked near Gettysburg by things they had previously discarded. Despite the grueling battle that follows, Johnny is unable to stop Valentine from seizing most of the corpse's parts.
16 (96)	Dirty Deeds Done Dirt Cheap; Itomo Tayasuku Okonawareru Egutsunai Kōi (いともたやすく行われる えげつない行為)	September 4, 2008	978-4-08-874574-9
60-61. "Both Sides Now (1-2)" (ボース・サイド・ナウ その①〜②, Bōsu Saido Nau Sono 1-2); 62. "Dirty Deeds Done Dirt Cheap" (いともたやすく行われる えげつない行為, Itomo Tayasuku Okonawareru Egutsunai Kōi); 63. "Seven Days in a Week" (7日で一週間, Nanoka de Ishūkan); 60. "To the Grounds of a Decisive Battle" (決戦の地へ, Kessen no Chi e); 61-62. "True Power (1-2)" (真の力(パワー)①〜②, Shin no Pawā 1-2)
The eighth stage of the race begins. Magent Magent attacks Steven Steel, but Wekapipo comes to his aid. Lucy flees after an unsuccessful attack on Valentine, but finds that the corpse's head has appeared within her womb. Gyro tells Johnny a joke about the days of the week.
17 (97)	D4C; Dī Fō Shī (D4C(ディ・フォー・シー))	March 4, 2009	978-4-08-874648-7
64-65. "Chocolate Disco (1-2)" (チョコレート・ディスコ その①〜②, Chokorēto Disuko Sono 1-2); 66-68. "D4C (1-3)" (D4C(ディ・フォー・シー) その①〜③, Dī Fō Shī Sono 1-3); 64-66. "True Power (3-5)" (真の力(パワー)③〜⑤, Shin no Pawā 3-5); 67. "The Unexplainable Chain" (不可解の連鎖, Fukakai no Rensa); 68. "The President Is Coming!" (大統領が来る！, Daitōryō ga Kuru!)
In Philadelphia, Valentine shoots Johnny in the head as one of his henchmen attacks Gyro. Wekapipo and Diego are then attacked by the president and his dimension-traversing ability.
18 (98)	Ticket to Ride; Chikettu Raido (涙の乗車券(チケット・ゥ・ライド))	July 3, 2009	978-4-08-874725-5
69-70. "D4C (4-5)" (D4C(ディ・フォー・シー) その④〜⑤, Dī Fō Shī Sono 4-5); 71-72. "Ticket to Ride (1-2)" (涙の乗車券(チケット・ゥ・ライド) その①〜②, Chikettu Raido 1-2); 69-70. "The President Is Coming! (2-3)" (大統領が来る！②〜③, Daitōryō ga Kuru! 2-3); 71. "Lucy Imprisoned" (囚われのルーシー, Toraware no Rūshī); 72. "To the Delaware River (1)" (デラウェア河(リバー)へ①, Derawea Ribā e 1)
Diego barely escapes death by sacrificing Wekapipo. Lucy attempts to escape the city, but falls into Valentine's clutches. A surviving Johnny and Gyro reunite and resolve to save Lucy Steel.
19 (99)	It Won't Make You Rich; Okane Mochi ni wa Narenai (お金持ちにはなれない)	November 4, 2009	978-4-08-874769-9
73-76. "D4C (6-9)" (D4C(ディ・フォー・シー) その⑥〜⑨, Dī Fō Shī Sono 6-9); 73-74. "To the Delaware River (2-3)" (デラウェア河(リバー)へ②〜③, Derawea Ribā e 2-3); 75. "Proof of Weakness" (弱点の証明, Jakuten no Shōmei); 76. "The Last Stand" (最後の砦, Saigo no Toride)
Diego and Hot Pants ambush Valentine aboard a train near the Delaware River as Johnny and Gyro approach. Diego pushes himself and the president out of the train, but fails to finish Valentine off. Meanwhile, the corpse parts Valentine has collected merge with Lucy Steel.
20 (100)	Love Train - The World Is One; Rabu Torein - Sekai wa Hitotsu (ラブトレイン-世界はひとつ)	March 9, 2010	978-4-08-870060-1
77. "D4C (10)" (D4C(ディ・フォー・シー) その⑩, Dī Fō Shī Sono 10); 78-80. "D4C (11-13): Love Train" (D4C(ディ・フォー・シー) その⑪〜⑬ -ラブトレイン-, Dī Fō Shī Sono 11-13 -Rabu Torein-); 77. "The Approaching Sign" (追い付く看板, Oitsuku Kanban); 78. "The Phenomenon and the Goddess" (現象と女神, Genshō to Megami); 79-80. "Justice and Evil (1-2)" (正義と邪悪①〜②, Seigi to Jaaku 1-2)
Valentine discovers that the complete corpse has granted him the ability to manipulate space, allowing him to easily kill Hot Pants before attacking Johnny and Gyro.
21 (101)	Ball Breaker; Bōru Bureikā (ボール・ブレイカー)	July 2, 2010	978-4-08-870099-1
81-82. "D4C (14-15): Love Train" (D4C(ディ・フォー・シー) その⑭〜⑮ -ラブトレイン-, Dī Fō Shī Sono 14-15 -Rabu Torein-); 83-84. "Ball Breaker (1-2)" (ボール・ブレイカー その①〜②, Bōru Bureikā Sono 1-2); 81-83. "Justice and Evil (3-5)" (正義と邪悪③〜⑤, Seigi to Jaaku 3-5); 84. "The Goddess's Jealousy" (女神の嫉妬, Megami no Shitto)
Valentine is wounded by Gyro's Spin. Gyro harnesses the golden ratio and summons its physical form, but part of the ball he uses is scraped away in the process, allowing Valentine to survive. Gyro imparts his final lesson to Johnny before being killed by Valentine.
22 (102)	Break My Heart, Break Your Heart; Bureiku Mai Hāto Bureiku Yua Hāto (ブレイク・マイ・ハート ブレイク・ユア・ハート)	November 4, 2010	978-4-08-870160-8
85-87. "Ball Breaker (3-5)" (ボール・ブレイカー その③〜⑤, Bōru Bureikā Sono 3-5); 88. "Break My Heart, Break Your Heart (1)" (ブレイク・マイ・ハート ブレイク・ユア・ハート その①, Bureiku Mai Hāto Bureiku Yua Hāto Sono 1); 85-88. "Lesson 5 (1-4)" (LESSON5①〜④, Ressun Faibu 1-4)
Johnny realizes the true meaning of Gyro's final words, unlocks his Stand's final form, and attacks the president directly. Valentine seemingly escapes, but finds that his body is immobilized by Johnny's infinite rotation ability. Valentine desperately offers to cease his attack and find another Gyro if Johnny nullifies the rotation.
23 (103)	High Voltage; Hai Vorutēji (ハイ・ヴォルテージ)	May 19, 2011	978-4-08-870206-3
89. "Break My Heart, Break Your Heart (2)" (ブレイク・マイ・ハート ブレイク・ユア・ハート その②, Bureiku Mai Hāto Bureiku Yua Hāto Sono 2); 90-91. "High Voltage (1-2)" (ハイ・ヴォルテージ その①〜②, Hai Vorutēji Sono 1-2); 89. "Lesson 5 (5)" (LESSON5⑤, Ressun Faibu 5); 90-91. "The New World (1-2)" (新たな世界①〜②, Arata na Sekai 1-2)
Johnny correctly suspects Valentine's deception, and the president is killed in the ensuing gunfight. The corpse separates from Lucy, but is then stolen by an unknown racer. As the two enter the race's final stage, Johnny discovers that the culprit is an alternate Diego summoned by Valentine, who wields the time-stopping Stand The World.
24 (104)	Stars and Stripes Forever; Seijōki yo Eien Nare (星条旗よ 永遠なれ)	June 3, 2011	978-4-08-870253-7
92-93. "High Voltage (3-4)" (ハイ・ヴォルテージ その③〜④, Hai Vorutēji Sono 3-4); 94. "The World of Stars and Stripes" (星条旗の世界, Seijōki no Sekai); 95. "The World of Stars and Stripes - Outro" (星条旗の世界-OUTRO, Seijōki no Sekai-Autoro); 92-94. "The New World (3-5)" (新たな世界③〜⑤, Arata na Sekai 3-5); 95. "The Destination of Happiness" (幸福の行方, Kōfuku no Yukue)
The alternate Diego inflicts the infinite rotation upon Johnny himself and finishes the race in first place. He then seals the corpse in an impenetrable vault to secure its power for himself, only to be annihilated by Lucy and the head of his dead counterpart. With aid from Steven, Johnny is able to nullify his own rotation. Later, Johnny boards a boat in order to deliver Gyro's body back to his home country.

=== 2017 release (Shueisha Bunko) ===
No.	Japanese release date	Japanese ISBN
1 (51)	February 17, 2017	978-4-08-619657-4
Chapters 1–8
2 (52)	February 17, 2017	978-4-08-619658-1
Chapters 9–16
3 (53)	March 17, 2017	978-4-08-619659-8
Chapters 17–24
4 (54)	March 17, 2017	978-4-08-619660-4
Chapters 25–28
5 (55)	April 18, 2017	978-4-08-619661-1
Chapters 29–33
6 (56)	April 18, 2017	978-4-08-619662-8
Chapters 34–37
7 (57)	May 18, 2017	978-4-08-619663-5
Chapters 38–42
8 (58)	June 16, 2017	978-4-08-619664-2
Chapters 43–47
9 (59)	July 18, 2017	978-4-08-619665-9
Chapters 48–52
10 (60)	August 18, 2017	978-4-08-619666-6
Chapters 53–58
11 (61)	September 15, 2017	978-4-08-619667-3
Chapters 59–63
12 (62)	October 18, 2017	978-4-08-619668-0
Chapters 64–70
13 (63)	November 17, 2017	978-4-08-619669-7
Chapters 71–77
14 (64)	December 15, 2017	978-4-08-619670-3
Chapters 78–83
15 (65)	January 18, 2018	978-4-08-619671-0
Chapters 84–89
16 (66)	January 18, 2018	978-4-08-619672-7
Chapters 90–95

=== English release ===
No.	English release date	English ISBN
1 (45) (Note: Continuing from the English JoJonium releases of Parts 1–3 and the hardcover releases of Parts 4–6.)	May 27, 2025	978-1-9747-5254-6
Chapters 1–11
2 (46)	July 22, 2025	978-1-9747-5517-2
Chapters 12–23
3 (47)	September 23, 2025	978-1-9747-5837-1
Chapters 24–30
4 (48)	November 25, 2025	978-1-9747-5889-0
Chapters 31–36
5 (49)	January 27, 2026	978-1-9747-6186-9
Chapters 37–42
6 (50)	March 24, 2026	978-1-9747-6225-5
Chapters 43–48
7 (51)	May 26, 2026	978-1-9747-6332-0
Chapters 49–55
8 (52)	July 28, 2026	978-1-9747-6494-5
Chapters 56–63
9 (53)	September 22, 2026	978-1-9747-6529-4
Chapters 64–72
10 (54)	November 24, 2026	978-1-9747-6551-5
11 (55)	January 26, 2027	978-1-9747-6626-0

== Anime adaptation ==
On April 12, 2025, as part of the JoJoday event held to celebrate the JoJo's Bizarre Adventure series, an anime adaptation of Steel Ball Run produced by David Production was announced. Key art, as well as character art for Johnny Joestar and Gyro Zeppeli, were revealed alongside a promotional video. During Anime Expo on July 4, 2025, the main production staff for the adaptation was revealed. Golden Wind co-directors Yasuhiro Kimura and Hideya Takahashi will reprise their roles, alongside returning series director Toshiyuki Kato, while Yasuko Kobayashi will oversee series composition. Daisuke Tsumagari returns as character designer, and Yugo Kanno will return to compose the music, with Yoshikazu Iwanami serving again as sound director. As with previous installments, David Production will handle animation production. Additional details were revealed during a livestream event on September 23 of the same year. The "first stage" of the series started streaming globally on Netflix on March 19, 2026. The second stage premiered on September 25, 2026. New episodes will be released every Friday. There will be a total of 11 episodes for the second and third stages.

== Reception ==
Kono Manga ga Sugoi! recommended Steel Ball Run as a good place to start for people who have not read previous parts, due to how it effectively serves as a reboot of the JoJo's Bizarre Adventure series, and appreciated how its move to the monthly seinen magazine Ultra Jump enabled Araki to write longer stories and depict things that would have been difficult to do in a shōnen manga magazine. Erkael of Manga-News called the manga one of the best in the series, and said that it does not disappoint the reader at any point. Anime News Network called Steel Ball Run an interesting take on the battle manga genre due to its positive portrayal of a hero with a disability, and found it, along with JoJolion, to represent a big shift in the evolution of Araki's art, following his earlier shift from muscle men to thinner characters and fashion.

K. Thor Jensen of Geek.com called the portrayal of Johnny and Gyro's relationship one of the best platonic friendships in comics, citing their transition from rivals to close allies who make sacrifices for one another and help each other with their respective abilities. Erkael liked the high speed and intensity of the story, saying that it was as if Araki wanted the reader to feel like they were part of the race themselves, and how the story eventually opens up to follow several different characters whose paths at times intersect, leading to a world that feels "rich and dense". They wrote that the lack of Stands early in the story, with Gyro instead using steel balls, was surprising but refreshing, and reminiscent of the Hamon abilities featured in the first part in the JoJo's Bizarre Adventure series, Phantom Blood; they still enjoyed the shift in focus to Stand abilities later in the story, calling them "original and surprising". Kono Manga ga Sugoi! liked the depiction of the landscapes Johnny and Gyro travel through, calling them "beautiful".
