= Bloody Stream =

- Cover art featuring Joseph Joestar

Single by Coda
- Released: January 30, 2013
- Genre: J-pop, acid jazz
- Length: 4:21
- Label: Warner Home Video
- Songwriters: Saori Kodama, Toshiyuki O'mori

JoJo's Bizarre Adventure theme song singles chronology
"JoJo (Sono Chi no Sadame)" (2012)	"Bloody Stream" (2013)	"Stand Proud" (2014)

"Bloody Stream" (stylized as "BLOODY STREAM") is the debut single by Japanese artist Coda. The song, written by Saori Kodama and composed by Toshiyuki O'mori, is used as the second opening theme for the 2012 anime adaptation of the 1987 manga JoJo's Bizarre Adventure, representing its second part Battle Tendency.

== Song ==
The song is noted as having an emotional and fashionable tune, with the "husky yet charming voice" of the song vocalist adding a stylish nature to the song as a whole.

== Reception ==
Jun Yamamoto of Billboard Japan said that he felt that the horns and funky sound of the song complement the story of Joseph Joestar and his battle against the Pillar Men Esidisi, Wamuu, and Kars, further mesmerizing him and drawing him into a "bizarre world".

== Sales ==
In its first week of sales, "Bloody Stream" sold 21 thousand units, reaching the number 4 spot on the Oricon's Weekly Album Charts. It also reached number 7 on Billboard's Japan Hot 100, 3 on the Japan Hot Single Sales chart, and number 2 on the Japan Hot Animation chart.

== Track listing ==
All lyrics are written by Saori Codama; all music is composed by Toshiyuki O'mori.

No.	Title	Length
1.	"Bloody Stream"	4:21
2.	"Bloody Stream" (Original Karaoke)	4:20
Total length:		8:41
