= Joseph Joestar =

Fictional character from JoJo's Bizarre Adventure

- JoJo's Bizarre Adventure character
- Joseph as he appears in part 2, Battle Tendency
- First appearance: JoJo's Bizarre Adventure chapter 45: "New York's JoJo" (November 2, 1987)
- Last appearance: JoJo's Bizarre Adventure chapter 439: "Goodbye, Morioh – The Golden Heart" (December 4, 1995)
- Created by: Hirohiko Araki
- Voiced by: Japanese: Kenji Utsumi (Drama CDs 1 & 3); Gorō Naya (Drama CD 2); Chikao Ōtsuka (OVA); Hōchū Ōtsuka (1998 arcade game, young); Tōru Ōkawa (1998 arcade game, old); Tomokazu Sugita (2012–present, young; 2018-present, old); Unshō Ishizuka (2013–2018, old); English: Michael Bennett (OVA); Benjamin Diskin (anime, young); Richard Epcar (anime, old)

In-universe information
- Full name: Joseph Joestar
- Nickname: JoJo
- Occupation: Real estate agent
- Family: George Joestar II (father); Lisa Lisa (mother)
- Spouses: Suzi Q (wife)
- Significant other: Tomoko Higashikata (mistress)
- Children: Holly Kujo (daughter); Josuke Higashikata (son); Shizuka Joestar (adoptive daughter)
- Relatives: Jonathan Joestar (grandfather); Erina Pendleton (grandmother); Jotaro Kujo (grandson); Jolyne Cujoh (great-granddaughter); Giorno Giovanna (half-uncle); George Joestar I (great-grandfather); Mary Joestar (great-grandmother)
- Nationality: British-American
- Stand: Hermit Purple
- Date of birth: September 27, 1920

Joseph "JoJo" Joestar (Japanese: ジョセフ・ジョースター, Hepburn: Josefu Jōsutā) is a fictional character in the Japanese manga series JoJo's Bizarre Adventure, written and illustrated by Hirohiko Araki. Joseph is the main protagonist of the series' second story arc, Battle Tendency, and the grandson of the first arc's protagonist, Jonathan Joestar. Having been brought up by his grandmother Erina and family friend Speedwagon, he developed a coarser and more rebellious attitude than that of his gentlemanly grandfather, but the character still has a noble heart. While able to use the supernatural power Hamon like his grandfather, Joseph is not initially as skilled in its use until he trains under his mother, Lisa Lisa. He initially uses a pair of Hamon-empowered clackers in battle, but relies more on mind games rather than brute strength in fights, employing his uncanny ability to predict his opponent's actions down to what they say.

He returns as a main character in Stardust Crusaders, set 50 years later, in which he has acquired the vine-like spiritual power (a "Stand") Hermit Purple (隠者の紫(ハーミットパープル), Hāmitto Pāpuru). Like many other Stands in Stardust Crusaders, it is named after a tarot card, in this case, The Hermit. He uses this stand to fight or perform predictions using electronic equipment such as cameras and television sets. Joseph leads the team of men to confront Dio in Egypt to save his daughter, Holly. He returns again as a supporting character in Diamond Is Unbreakable, where he meets his illegitimate son Josuke Higashikata and is shown to be physically and mentally weaker now due to old age. In the alternate universe of the series' eighth part, JoJolion, a character named Joseph "Josefumi" Joestar bears resemblance to Joseph and appears as a flashback character.

Araki based Joseph on Jonathan visually in order to have some continuity, because it was unheard of to kill the main character in a Weekly Shōnen Jump manga at the time. His personality, however, was made to contrast with that of his predecessor, with Joseph being cockier. Critical response to Joseph's characterization and actions in the narratives of both Battle Tendency and Stardust Crusaders were mostly positive, with game designer Hiroshi Matsuyama regarding him as the best shōnen manga hero he has ever seen.

== Creation and development ==
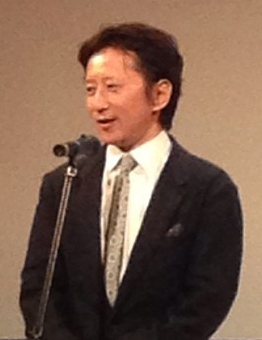
Hirohiko Araki purposefully designed Joseph to look like the manga's previous protagonist Jonathan, but now regrets it decades later.

Because it was "unprecedented" to kill off the main character in a Weekly Shōnen Jump manga in 1987, author Hirohiko Araki purposely designed Joseph to look the same as JoJo's Bizarre Adventure Part 1's protagonist Jonathan. Although he did give the new character a different personality, looking back after eight story arcs, Araki said he does wish he had differentiated the two's visual designs a bit more. Referring to Jonathan as rather passive and a bit uninteresting as a main character, the author said that Joseph is more proactive and more of an "adventurer"; explaining that as he wrote Joseph's tale, it was as if the character himself was in control of how the story progressed. Having not been able to show a friendly rivalry between Jonathan and Dio in Part 1, Araki introduced Caesar Zeppeli to present a more positive friendly rivalry between him and Joseph.

Araki called Joseph a swindler in comparison to the gentlemanly Jonathan, because he is constantly looking to win and will engage in reckless behavior without hesitation. This was not only to create contrast between the two, but also because the author wanted to shift from the physical battles in Part 1 to more "cerebral" fights. He wanted Joseph to be a shōnen manga hero who bends the rules as he fights, like the protagonist of his earlier series Cool Shock B.T., winning by cunning and logic, instead of bravery and perseverance. Araki fleshed the character's personality out by having him predict the actions of his opponents ahead of time. He referred to Joseph as "a muscle-bound B.T.", achieved by adding some Sylvester Stallone to B.T., plus some added cheerfulness to make him "jolly." Araki stated that Joseph is the character that connects the Joestar bloodline to Parts 3 and 4, and although he had Jonathan die in Part 1, he never even considered killing off Joseph.

Araki said he had a lot of readers asking him to bring older characters back. Although he is not a fan of bringing them back simply for nostalgia, he did not hesitate having Joseph return 50 years later in Stardust Crusaders to save his daughter because it is completely true to the character. The author thought of having Joseph drop out partway through due to his age, but ended up "playing it by ear" as serialization continued. He gave him the role of "navigator", introducing the readers to the Joestar family, Dio, Hamon and Stands. But because Joseph is a JoJo, Araki made sure to make it clear that Jotaro was the main character of Part 3. He partly achieved this by making drastic changes in his appearance, justified by his age. For the same reasons, Joseph's Stand was made a support ability that allows visual or aural psychic projection, rather than offensive like a protagonist would have. A navigator or guide needs "lines" to gather information from across the world, and Hermit Purple was inspired by telephone lines and network cables; the vines being representative of these physical lines and cables. Stands being a succession of the Hamon and Hamon being life energy that spreads across the body through breathing, Araki thought Joseph's Hermit Purple vines wrapping around his body were a visual representation of that as well.

The TV anime adaptation uses a song titled "Bloody Stream" sung by Japanese artist Coda. Written by Saori Kodama and composed by Toshiyuki O'mori, Jun Yamamoto of Billboard said that he felt that the horns and funky sound of the song complement the story of Joseph and his battle against the Pillar Men: Esidisi, Wamuu, and Kars; further mesmerizing him and drawing him into a "bizarre world."

== Appearances ==
=== Battle Tendency ===
At the start of Part 2, Joseph and his grandmother Erina move from London to New York. In Joseph's first scene he has his money stolen off him from a child named Smokey Brown who soon becomes a supporting character. Meanwhile, former thug turned oil baron Robert E. O. Speedwagon invites Straizo to Mexico to destroy a sleeping Pillar Man with Hamon. Straizo instead wounds Speedwagon, and uses a stone mask near the Pillar Man and Speedwagon's blood to become an immortal vampire. Straizo goes to New York to destroy Joseph and Erina, believed to be the last people who know about the stone mask. When Joseph defeats Straizo, Straizo tells him that the Pillar Man is about to awaken and he will meet him soon. Intrigued, Joseph goes to Mexico where he saves Speedwagon, who survived, from the awakened Pillar Man named Santana, and tricks Santana into being turned to stone by the sunlight reflected from a well. Joseph and Speedwagon travel to Rome, where they meet Caesar Zeppeli, a young man who did Hamon training to continue the legacy of his father and grandfather. However, the group arrives too late to prevent Kars, Wamuu, and Esidisi from awakening. Joseph plays on Wamuu's pride and convinces Wamuu to let him live to be a more worthy opponent. Both Wamuu and Esidisi implant poison-filled rings in his aorta and windpipe respectively, giving Joseph 33 days to get the antidotes from each of them.

Joseph and Caesar do Hamon training under Lisa Lisa on an island off the coast of Venice. Joseph and Caesar destroy Esidisi. The group track Kars and Wamuu to Switzerland. Caesar is killed fighting Wamuu one-on-one, but is able to take his antidote and get it to Joseph before dying. Joseph and Lisa Lisa then confront Kars and Wamuu for the Super Aja, Lisa Lisa bluffing that she has a timed explosive that will destroy the stone. Joseph kills Wamuu in battle. Kars acquires the Super Aja and uses it along with the stone mask to become the ultimate being. Now immune to the sun and able to use Hamon, Kars' only desire is to kill Joseph. Kars attempts to kill Joseph with Hamon, but Joseph instinctively holds up the Super Aja, which causes the energy to make the volcano eruption climax, sending Joseph and Kars flying into the sky on a large rock. Kars is knocked into space by volcanic debris and drifts for eternity. Unable to die, Kars eventually stops thinking. Joseph is nursed to health by Lisa Lisa's assistant Suzi Q, whom he marries. Later, he follows his mother, migrates to the United States, and takes up American citizenship.

=== Stardust Crusaders ===
Joseph Joestar's grandson, Jotaro Kujo has been arrested, and refuses to leave his cell, believing he is possessed by an evil spirit. After being called to Japan by Holly, Joseph's daughter and Jotaro's mother, Joseph arrives with an associate, Mohammed Avdol. They explain that Jotaro's "evil spirit" is actually a manifestation of his fighting spirit, called a Stand, and reveal that they possess Stands as well. Joseph explains that the sudden appearance of their Stands is caused by the nemesis of his grandfather: Dio. Shortly after being released, Jotaro encounters Noriaki Kakyoin, who he saves from being brainwashed. Unfortunately, Holly soon becomes gravely ill due to a Stand manifesting in her, which is slowly killing her due to her reserved personality. With little hesitation, Jotaro, Joseph, Avdol, and Kakyoin begin a journey to Egypt to kill Dio and save Holly's life. On the way, they are joined by another reformed assassin named Jean Pierre Polnareff, who seeks to avenge his sister's death at one of Dio's allies. Jotaro, Joseph, Kakyoin, and Polnareff ultimately encounter Dio, and escape his mansion. A chase across Cairo follows, leading to Kakyoin confronting Dio and his Stand, The World. Though fatally wounded by The World, Kakyoin deduces the Stand's ability to stop time for a few seconds and relays it to Joseph before dying (he is revived). Joseph is able to pass it on to Jotaro, but is killed by Dio, who extends his ability duration from 5 to 9 seconds thanks to Joseph's blood. Jotaro then fights Dio alone, slowly discovering that he shares Dio's time-stopping ability. The battle ends with Jotaro defeating Dio using the ability and subsequently killing him. Jotaro later revives Joseph via blood transfusion from Dio's corpse, and the two destroy Dio's corpse with sunlight. Jotaro and Joseph then bid Polnareff farewell before returning to Japan, as Holly has made a full recovery.

=== Diamond is Unbreakable ===
Now an old man and nearly senile, Joseph is revealed to be the father of Part 4's protagonist Josuke Higashikata without knowing that he had had a child, resulting from an affair with Tomoko Higashikata whom he later abandons afterwards with no real interest in seeing her again. He visits the Japanese town of Morioh where he meets Josuke and adopts a baby girl, whom he names Shizuka, and who appears invisible at all times as an effect of her Stand. He tells Yukako Yamagishi about the Cinderella beauty clinic, which leads to the "Yukako Yamagishi Dreams of Cinderella" story arc (this scene was not included in the anime). After the part's main antagonist, Yoshikage Kira, is killed by an ambulance, Joseph and Jotaro leave Morioh, but the former has his money stolen by Josuke. The scene in which Joseph has his money stolen is the last scene in the series in which Joseph is present. He also has his money stolen from him in his first scene which is mentioned earlier in this page.

=== Stone Ocean ===
While Joseph does not appear in Stone Ocean, Araki has stated in an interview that it's possible that he's still alive, if a bit more senile. If true, he would be roughly 91 years-old.

=== JoJolion ===
A version of Joseph named Joseph "Fumi" Joestar is introduced in the final chapters of JoJolion in flashback sequences of Morioh in 1941. The grandson of Steel Ball Run protagonist Johnny Joestar, Fumi has some similarities to his original counterpart along with a humanoid version of Hermit Purple as his Stand. He meets Suzi Q in 1952 through the Speedwagon Foundation and marries her. Holy Joestar-Kira, based on Holy Kujo, and the new character Barbara Ann Joestar are their daughters.

== Abilities ==
Joseph Joestar inherited a natural capacity for the energy-based Hamon martial arts technique. While unskilled with it until he began training under his mother, he uses its conductive properties on a pair of clackers and other objects in battle. Opposed to brute strength, Joseph is highly skilled at mind games and stage magic techniques which he uses to disarm his opponents, such as slipping objects like live grenades on their person. Joseph's favorite tactic is predicting the next line their opponent will say and announcing it to them before it's said. He frequently uses the tactic to mentally attack his opponent, either making them annoyed or fearful. Joseph also has a "secret technique" that he uses as a last resort. He will run away from his opponent, making himself look cowardly but in actuality using the tactic to stall for a plan while getting his opponent into a more advantageous location.

Joseph returns in Stardust Crusaders with his Hamon abilities and martial arts diminished. In its place he gains his Stand ability Hermit Purple, a vine-like spiritual power that can conduct Hamon and act as a weapon or armor. By using it on cameras or television sets Joseph can record photographs or footage of people or places from far away. He demonstrates this ability by destroying an expensive Polaroid camera in Japan, which then printed a photo of Dio Brando, who was located in Egypt. Despite weakness with age he still possesses quick thinking and intellect over his opponents. Joseph no longer uses Hamon but still possesses Hermit Purple during Diamond is Unbreakable.

== Reception ==
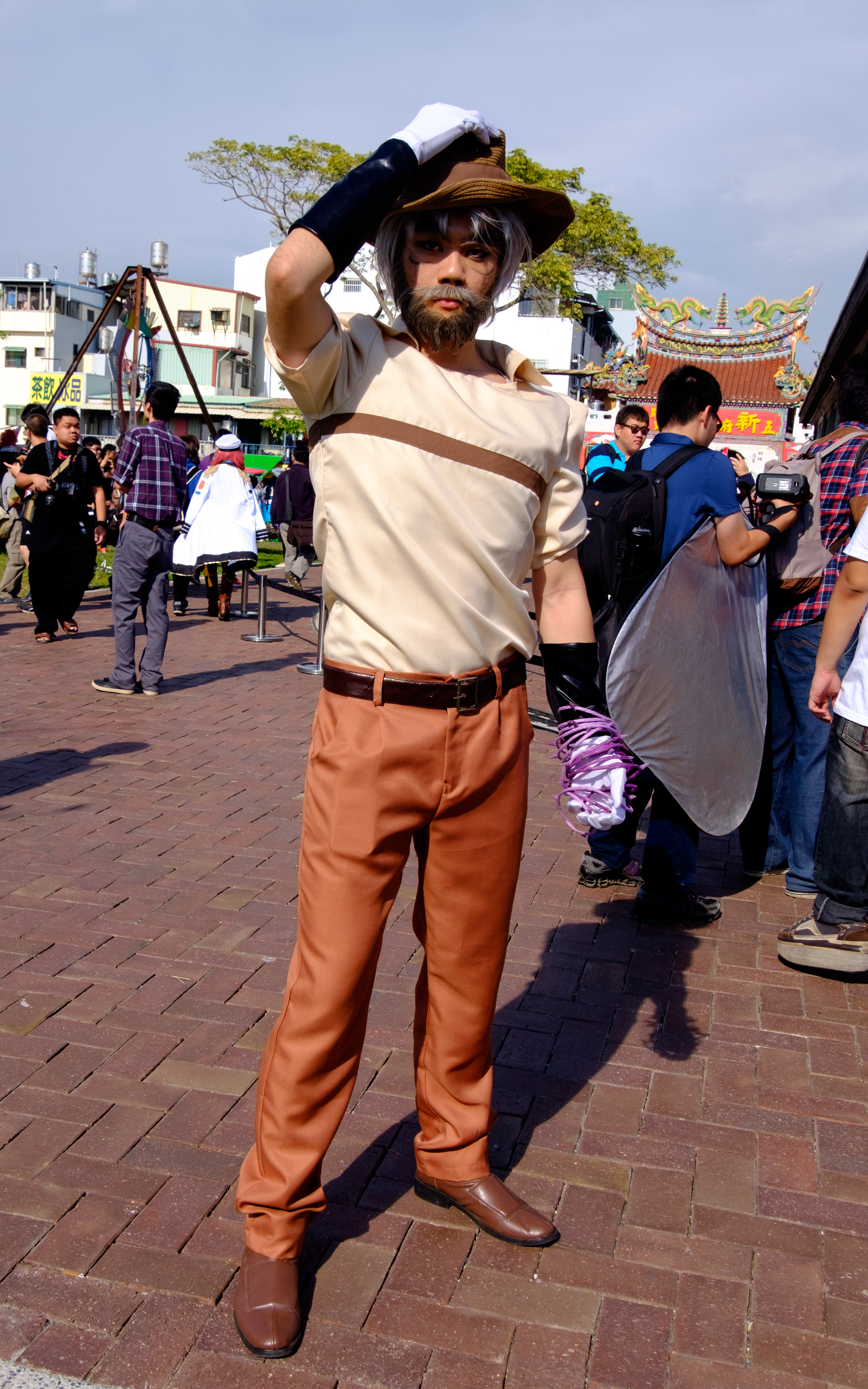
Cosplay of Joseph Joestar as he appears in Stardust Crusaders

Critical response to Joseph has been positive. Silverman felt positively about how strikingly different the protagonist Joseph is from Part 1's Jonathan due to the former's cockier personality. Though the writer felt that Joseph and Caesar's relationship gradually developed in the manga, the writer felt it was the latter who was a more annoying character. Kotaku described Joseph as a better main character than Jonathan for his display of intelligence when confronting the antagonists. Similarly, Joel Loynds of The Linc enjoyed the distinct personalities of Jojo's Bizarre Adventure the contrast Joseph has with Jonathan and his successor, Jotaro. Hiroshi Matsuyama from CyberConnect2 selected Joseph as his favorite Jojo's Bizarre Adventure hero based on his Battle Tendency portrayal which he felt was the "epitome of shonen manga". The Fandom Post was harsher, stating that while Joseph has charisma, he is still too cocky in the narrative due to how he manages to convince the Pillar Men to let him train so that he fight in a stronger form. The writer felt that sometimes Joseph was more comical to the point it feels he is breaking the fourth wall. Comic Book Resources made an article centered solely on Joseph, pointing out multiple appealing traits from his character that do not make sense when taken seriously such as his ability to predict others' following line or surprising the actual narrator of the series who states he dies in Battle Tendency. The death of Caesar before Part 2's climax was noted to be forced to make Jojo's characterization develop and take a more mature compromise with his mission in contrast to his earlier appearances.

Reviewing Stardust Crusaders for Anime News Network, Rebecca Silverman enjoyed seeing Part 2's Joseph team up with new protagonist Jotaro and was impressed that Araki was able to keep Dio out of Part 2 completely, only to bring him back for Part 3. Anime UK News stated that Joseph and Avdol share one of the most hilarious fights in Stardust Crusaders based on how they accidentally sexually harass each other when being attacked by a Stand User working for Dio. Comic Book Resources still felt that Joseph was a still appealing supporting character for retaining the intelligence despite his age. The Fandom Post also praised Joseph's still intact characterization despite having noticeably aged ever since Battle Tendency. Joseph's middle-aged persona ranked as 18th best coolest character in Japan while his beard ranked sixth in another. In the Newtype anime awards for 2013, Joseph was voted as fourth best male character.
