= JoJo's Bizarre Adventure season 1 =

Season of television series

JoJo's Bizarre Adventure
- Season 1

Key visuals for Phantom Blood (L) and Battle Tendency (R)
- No. of episodes: 26

Release
- Original network: Tokyo MX
- Original release: October 6, 2012 – April 6, 2013

Season chronology
- Next → Season 2: Stardust; Crusaders

The first season of the anime television series JoJo's Bizarre Adventure (ジョジョの奇妙な冒険, JoJo no Kimyō na Bōken) produced by David Production, also known as JoJo's Bizarre Adventure: The Animation, adapts the first two arcs of Hirohiko Araki's manga series of the same name: Phantom Blood (ファントムブラッド, Fantomu Buraddo) and Battle Tendency (戦闘潮流, Sentō Chōryū). The Phantom Blood arc, which aired on Tokyo MX between October 6 and December 1, 2012, revolves around the bizarre adventures of the Joestar family, beginning with an encounter involving Jonathan Joestar, his adoptive brother Dio Brando, and a Stone Mask that transforms people into vampires. The Battle Tendency arc, which aired on Tokyo MX between December 8, 2012, and April 6, 2013, focuses on Jonathan's grandson, Joseph Joestar, and his fight against the Pillar Men, ancient humanoids which created the Stone Mask.

The series was released on a series of nine DVDs and Blu-rays between January 30 and September 27, 2013, with the Blu-ray releases having the option of English subtitles. Crunchyroll began streaming the series in April 2014. The English DVD was released by Warner Home Video on September 22, 2015, with both English and Japanese audio with closed captioning for the English dub only. Viz Media released an English Blu-ray set on July 25, 2017, that includes English and Japanese audio with new subtitles for the Japanese. A second season, JoJo's Bizarre Adventure: Stardust Crusaders, based on the series' third arc, began airing from April 5, 2014.

== Plot ==
The first season is split into two parts: part 1 comprises episodes 1–9, covering the Phantom Blood story arc, while part 2 comprises episodes 10–26, covering the Battle Tendency story arc.

The first part, Phantom Blood, is set in the early-to-late 1880s in England. (Note: Dario Brando dies in 1880 while Jonathan Joestar defeats Dio Brando on February 7, 1889.) George Joestar takes in the orphan Dio Brando to pay off a debt to Dio's late father Dario. Dio's attempts to become the sole heir to the Joestar fortune are thwarted and he resorts to using an ancient Stone Mask which transforms him into a vampire with his sights now set on world domination. With Will A. Zeppeli, a master of a supernatural ability called Hamon, and former street thug Robert E.O. Speedwagon at his side, George's son Jonathan trains in Hamon and stops Dio who is left aboard an exploding ship after he mortally wounds Jonathan. However, Jonathan's wife Erina is pregnant with a child and escapes, continuing the Joestar name.

The second part, Battle Tendency, takes place in 1939. Jonathan's grandson Joseph teams up with Will's grandson Caesar Zeppeli to battle ancient humanoids called the Pillar Men, but are overwhelmed by the Pillar Man Wamuu. Joseph and Caesar have a month to defeat the Pillar Men Esidisi and Wamuu to obtain the antidotes for the poisoned rings in Joseph's windpipe and aorta, while also preventing them from gaining a powerful stone called the Red Stone of Aja. The two are trained in controlling Hamon by the Hamon coach Lisa Lisa. Joseph defeats Esidisi and Wamuu, but Kars obtains the Red Stone of Aja, becoming more powerful. Aided by the German soldier Rudol von Stroheim, Joseph uses the Red Stone of Aja against Kars to defeat him. In the epilogue set in the 1980s, a "treasure chest" engraved with the name "Dio" is salvaged from the sea, while an older Joseph is set to meet his daughter in Japan.

== Episodes ==
No. overall (Note: Order of episodes in both the series and season)	No. in part (Note: Order of episodes within the part)	Title	Directed by	Written by	Storyboarded by	Original release date (Note: Tokyo MX lists the series as premiering at 24:30 on Friday, which is effectively Saturday at 12:30 a.m. JST.)	English air date (Note: All episodes of the first season were initially released in English on home media on September 22, 2015, but to correspond with the Japanese column, the air dates here will refer to their first English television airings on Adult Swim's Toonami programming block.)
Phantom Blood
1	1	"Dio the Invader"; Transliteration: "Shinryaku-sha Dio" (Japanese: 侵略者ディオ)	Kōta Okuno	Yasuko Kobayashi	Naokatsu Tsuda	October 6, 2012	October 16, 2016
In 1868 England, petty thief Dario Brando attempts to loot a crashed carriage belonging to nobleman George Joestar. When George wakes up, Dario deceives him into believing he saved his life. In 1880, George's son Jonathan Joestar is a young man with the intent to become a gentleman, such as fighting for a woman's honor even if he would not win. Meanwhile, the dying Dario tells his son Dio Brando to move in with the Joestar family to fulfill his own life debt to the Joestars. Dio does so, intending to take the Joestar fortune for himself. Dio outshines Jonathan while making him a pariah among his family and friends. Dio takes the first kiss from Jonathan's childhood love Erina Pendleton and makes her unable to look Jonathan in the eye. Upon learning of Dio's action, Jonathan goes into a rage and beats Dio up. Some of Dio's blood is spilled on an ancient Stone Mask that seems to react until the fight is broken up by George. In retaliation for his perceived humiliation, Dio kills Jonathan's beloved dog, Danny, by putting him in the incinerator.
2	2	"A Letter from the Past"; Transliteration: "Kako kara no Tegami" (Japanese: 過去からの手紙)	Toshiyuki Katō	Yasuko Kobayashi	Toshiyuki Katō	October 13, 2012	October 23, 2016
In 1888, George becomes ill and bed-ridden. While doing research on the strange mask, Jonathan finds the dying Dario's letter and finds his symptoms are the same as George's. Using Dio's pride against him, Jonathan deduces that Dio murdered Dario and intends to do the same with George. After leaving instructions for only trusted doctors to tend to his father, Jonathan sets off to London to discover the origins of the poison. Fearing Jonathan would ruin his plans, Dio steals the Stone Mask with the intent to arrange an accidental death with it. In London's Ogre Street, Jonathan is attacked by the thug Robert E. O. Speedwagon. But Jonathan's sense of honor and desire to save his father convinces Speedwagon to assist in the search for an Oriental druggist. Meanwhile, assuming that Jonathan died in Ogre Street, Dio crosses paths with two drunkards. He slits one of them to subject the other to an activated Stone Mask. Instead of killing the second drunkard like Dio thought it would, the mask turns the victim into a powerful vampire that nearly kills Dio, but Dio is saved when the sun rises and the sunlight turns the vampire to dust.
3	3	"Youth with Dio"; Transliteration: "Dio to no Seishun" (Japanese: ディオとの青春)	Futoshi Higashide	Yasuko Kobayashi	Futoshi Higashide	October 20, 2012	November 6, 2016
At the Joestar mansion, Jonathan returns with an antidote for George and intends to turn Dio in to the police. Dio attempts to show remorse for his actions but Speedwagon intervenes to expose Dio for his lies. He tells Jonathan that Dio was born evil and brings the druggist Wang Chan who sold Dio the poison. Evading arrest, Dio attempts to kill Jonathan but George takes the knife in his place and dies in his son's arms. Using George's blood, Dio proceeds to use the mask on himself to become an immortal vampire. As several attempts to kill Dio fail, Jonathan sets the mansion on fire and leads Dio to the roof so Speedwagon can escape. Jonathan attempts to sacrifice himself by dragging Dio down to a fiery death, but Dio's attempted counter forces Jonathan to use the layout to safely land while impaling Dio on the statue of Joestar family's guardian angel. Speedwagon pulls Jonathan to safety. Dio survives by draining Chan of his blood when Chan attempts to grab the mask from among the debris.
4	4	"Overdrive"; Transliteration: "Ōbādoraibu" (Japanese: 波紋疾走(オーバードライブ))	Masashi Abe	Shōgo Yasukawa	Masashi Abe	October 27, 2012	November 13, 2016
In the hospital, Jonathan rekindles his friendship with Erina, who now works as a nurse. A man called Will A. Zeppeli heals Jonathan's broken arm with a supernatural technique called Hamon. Meanwhile, Dio continues to prowl London, recruiting the worst men he knows into his undead army, including Jack the Ripper. As Zeppeli trains Jonathan to master Hamon, which kills vampires, he explains how he has dedicated himself to mastering Hamon in order to destroy the mask. Jonathan, Speedwagon, and Zeppeli travel to the town of Windknight's Lot, where people have gone missing. Whilst passing through a tunnel into the town, they are attacked by Jack. As Jack tries to lure them into a trap, Jonathan is tasked by Zeppeli to finish him off without spilling any of the wine Zeppeli has poured into a glass. Using the wine, Jonathan comes to understand Hamon, allowing him to kill Jack from the other side of a wall using his own Hamon technique: Overdrive.
5	5	"The Dark Knights"; Transliteration: "Ankoku no Kishi-tachi" (Japanese: 暗黒の騎士達)	Mitsuhiro Yoneda & Hitomi Ezoe	Kazuyuki Fudeyasu	Toshifumi Takizawa	November 3, 2012	November 20, 2016
In Windknight's Lot, a pickpocket boy called Poco, hypnotized by Dio, lures Jonathan and the group to the graveyard where they are attacked by Dio's legion of zombies. Zeppeli attempts to use his Hamon attacks on Dio, but he counters by freezing his veins. After also freezing Jonathan's hand, Dio summons two powerful zombie knights, Tarkus (Note: In the English dub and subtitles, Tarkus is named "Tarukus".) and Bruford, (Note: In the English dub and subtitles, Bruford is named "Blueford".) to finish the job for him. As Jonathan struggles against them, Speedwagon uses his body heat to thaw Zeppeli's arm. Jonathan and Bruford's fight moves into the depths of a nearby lake. As Jonathan dives deeper into the lake, Bruford follows, but Jonathan finds an air pocket under a rock and uses this breath of air to launch a Turquoise Blue Overdrive attack at Bruford.
6	6	"Tomorrow's Courage"; Transliteration: "Ashita no Yūki" (Japanese: あしたの勇気)	Shingo Uchida	Kazuyuki Fudeyasu	Taizō Yoshida	November 10, 2012	November 27, 2016
Bruford barely avoids Jonathan's attack and ensnares Jonathan with his hair. However, Jonathan blocks Bruford's attack and channels an Overdrive attack through his sword, disintegrating one of his arms, before unleashing a fatal barrage against him. As Bruford dies, he regains his human soul and leaves Jonathan his sword. Tarkus then attacks, but Jonathan and Zeppeli get Speedwagon and Poco to safety using Hamon to form a bunch of leaves as a hang glider. As Tarkus leaps after them, they touch down at a knight's training ground to stand against him. Jonathan is pulled inside the grounds by Tarkus, thrusting him into a Chain Neck Deathmatch, in which one must decapitate the other in order to free himself. Realizing Jonathan will be killed if no one does anything, Poco overcomes his nerves and enters the grounds via a window. Poco unlocks the door so Zeppeli can get inside.
7	7	"Sorrowful Successor"; Transliteration: "Uketsugu-mono" (Japanese: うけ継ぐ者)	Toshiyuki Katō	Shōgo Yasukawa	Toshiyuki Katō	November 17, 2012	December 4, 2016
Zeppeli recalls how his Hamon teacher Tonpetty foretold his death would take place in the very place he is in right now. Knowing this, Zeppeli fights against Tarkus with the intention of finding a way to free Jonathan. However, Tarkus ensnares Zeppeli with a chain and rips his body into two. Using his remaining strength, Zeppeli transfers the last of his Hamon energy to Jonathan. Jonathan heals his injuries, breaks free from his chains, and obliterates Tarkus. Following the battle, Zeppeli tells Jonathan that he has accepted his fate and has passed his will onto him before passing away. As Jonathan, Speedwagon, and Poco make their way back to Windknight's Lot, they meet Tonpetty, along with his other students, Dire and Straizo. Meanwhile, Poco's sister has been kidnapped by Dio.
8	8	"Bloody Battle! JoJo & Dio"; Transliteration: "Kessen! JoJo to Dio" (Japanese: 血戦！JOJO &(と) DIO)	Jirō Fujimoto	Yasuko Kobayashi	Toshifumi Takizawa	November 24, 2012	December 11, 2016
Dio sends a zombie named Doobie to attack Poco's sister after she refuses to join his legion. Jonathan and the others arrive in time to save her. Doobie delivers a few bites on Jonathan with the poisonous snakes in his head, but neither the venom nor Doobie stands up to Jonathan's power. Poco and his sister reunite. Dire launches a Thunder Cross Split Attack on Dio, but he is caught by Dio's freezing ability and is shattered into pieces. Jonathan slices his sword straight through Dio's body, but Dio freezes his sword and attacks Jonathan's neck. However, Jonathan thaws himself by heating the sword with a torch. Jonathan sets his fists on fire to counter Dio's freezing and breaks through Dio's defenses with an Overdrive attack. As his body melts and he falls into the abyss, Dio launches a final laser eye attack that only manages to pierce Jonathan's hand.
9	9	"The Final Ripple!"; Transliteration: "Saigo no Hamon!" (Japanese: 最後の波紋！)	Kenichi Suzuki	Yasuko Kobayashi	Kenichi Suzuki	December 1, 2012	December 18, 2016
Before his body disintegrates, Dio decapitates his head to survive the Hamon attack, while Speedwagon destroys the Stone Mask with a hammer. Sometime later, Jonathan marries Erina, but as they depart on a ship to the United States to go on their honeymoon, Dio and the zombified Wang Chen sneak aboard. On February 7, 1889, Dio fatally injures Jonathan as he intends to take his body to use as his own, while Chen turns the ship's passengers into zombies. Using his remaining Hamon energy, Jonathan decapitates Chan and compels his body to obstruct the ship's paddle wheel, setting it to explode. As Erina resolves to die by her husband's side, Jonathan instead tells her to live on and protect a baby whose mother died during the zombie attack. Jonathan passes away with Dio's head in his arms. Erina and the baby hide in Dio's bomb-proof coffin to protect them from the explosion. Erina is rescued near the Canary Islands, and vows to pass on the truth of what happened to the unborn child she conceived with Jonathan and generations to follow.
Battle Tendency
10	1	"New York's JoJo"; Transliteration: "Nyū Yōku no JoJo" (Japanese: ニューヨークのジョジョ)	Takahiro Majima	Yasuko Kobayashi	Taizō Yoshida	December 8, 2012	December 18, 2016
In 1938, Speedwagon, now a wealthy oil tycoon, travels with Straizo to Mexico, where they uncover a tomb filled with Stone Masks and a petrified yet living body embedded in a stone pillar. However, Straizo, obsessed with immortality, kills Speedwagon's archaeological team and uses some of the wounded Speedwagon's blood to activate a Stone Mask. Meanwhile, Joseph Joestar, Jonathan and Erina's grandson, has recently moved to New York City from England with Erina. Joseph uses his Hamon to save a young pickpocket named Smokey Brown from some crooked cops. Smokey is then taken in by Erina. Joseph is later confronted by a rejuvenated Straizo who has come to kill him before his abilities become more powerful. Joseph makes the first move with a surprise Tommy gun attack after being informed of Speedwagon's death prior to this.
11	2	"The Game Master"; Transliteration: "Gēmu no Tatsujin" (Japanese: ゲームの達人)	Mitsuhiro Yoneda	Shinichi Inotsume	Mitsuhiro Yoneda	December 15, 2012	January 8, 2017
Straizo recovers from Joseph's attack and uses the same laser eye attack Dio used on Jonathan to seemingly pierce through Joseph's head and neck. However, Joseph tricks him into attacking a mirror reflection. Joseph flees to the Brooklyn Bridge. Straizo catches up and once again attacks Joseph with his laser, but Joseph reflects it back at him with a Hamon glass before striking him with Hamon. Straizo reveals that the Pillar Man in Mexico has been feeding off the blood he spilled and is about to wake from a 2000-year slumber. Straizo kills himself with Hamon stored in his body. Meanwhile in Mexico, a German military general named Rudol von Stroheim, searching for ways to enhance the German military effort interrogates a still-living Speedwagon about the Pillar Man which Stroheim intends to revive. Joseph makes his way to Mexico concerned about the Pillar Man, unaware that he is being followed by a strange assassin.
12	3	"The Pillar Man"; Transliteration: "Hashira no Otoko" (Japanese: 柱の男)	Yukio Nishimoto	Kazuyuki Fudeyasu	Yukio Nishimoto	December 22, 2012	January 15, 2017
Joseph is confronted in the desert by Donovan, (Note: In the English dub, Donovan is named "Donoban". In the English subtitles, he is named "Donobang".) one of Stroheim's assassins, but subdues him and learns that Speedwagon is still alive. Meanwhile, Stroheim awakens the Pillar Man, dubbed by Stroheim as Santana, (Note: In the English dub, Santana is named "San Viento". In the English subtitles, he is named "Santviento".) by sacrificing several prisoners to flood the figure with blood. To test Santana, Stroheim sends in a prisoner that was made into a vampire by a stone mask. Santana absorbs the vampire into his body to feed himself before uttering Stroheim's name. He escapes into an air vent which he then uses to enter the observation chamber. He then confronts Stroheim over being prematurely awakened, entering the body of a dead soldier which he then uses to kill the other soldiers by mimicking their gunfire. At that moment, Joseph who sneaked into the base, uses his Hamon to shield Joseph, Speedwagon, and Stroheim with some of Stroheim's hair.
13	4	"JoJo vs. the Ultimate Lifeform"; Transliteration: "JoJo tai Kyūkyoku Seibutsu" (Japanese: JOJO vs.(たい) 究極生物)	Yasuhiro Minami & Kenichi Suzuki	Shōgo Yasukawa	Futoshi Higashide	January 5, 2013	January 22, 2017
Joseph initially refuses to fight Santana and explains he is only in Mexico to bring Speedwagon back to America. Santana attacks Joseph when he finds him annoying, causing Joseph to hit back. Joseph's Hamon and Santana's skin makes both Joseph's Hamon and Santana's absorbing ability ineffective. Joseph feigns being unconscious to use his Hamon within Santana's body to rip him in half. Joseph attempts to drag Santana's torso into the sunlight to petrify him, only to be immobilized by Santana's flesh before he can reach the exit. Stroheim tries to open the door himself, but Santana ensnares his leg. Joseph chops off Stroheim's leg, allowing him to open the door and expose Santana to the sunlight. Santana dives into Stroheim's body through his wound and manipulates his body in an attempt to hide in the well. Stroheim informs Joseph of other Pillar Men the Wehrmacht discovered in Europe. Telling Joseph to meet someone Speedwagon knows in Rome, Stroheim explodes a grenade on himself in an attempt to destroy Santana. Santana survives and attacks Joseph. Joseph uses the noon sunlight reflected in the well's water to turn Santana to stone.
14	5	"Ultimate Warriors from Ancient Times"; Transliteration: "Taiko kara Kita Kyūkyoku Senshi" (Japanese: 太古から来た究極戦士)	Toshiyuki Katō	Shōgo Yasukawa	Toshiyuki Katō	January 12, 2013	January 29, 2017
Speedwagon takes Santana to the Speedwagon Foundation in Washington, D.C. Santana is still alive, but Speedwagon's scientists keep him dormant by the use of ultraviolet light. In Rome, Joseph and Speedwagon meet Will Zeppeli's grandson, Caesar. Both Joseph and Caesar express a dislike towards each other as they test each other's Hamon abilities. Caesar then makes arrangements for Joseph and Speedwagon to be taken to the Colosseum where the Pillar Men are being kept. One of the Pillar Men, Wamuu, breaks free, killing a group of German soldiers and awakening his masters, Kars and Esidisi. As they leave, Wamuu accidentally bumps into Caesar's friend Mark, destroying half of his body. Caesar is forced to use his Hamon to peacefully end Mark's suffering and vows vengeance against the Pillar Men.
15	6	"A Hero's Proof"; Transliteration: "Hīrō no Shikaku" (Japanese: ヒーローの資格)	Masaya Sasaki	Shōgo Yasukawa	Taizō Yoshida	January 19, 2013	February 5, 2017
Caesar engages Wamuu in battle. Wamuu counters Caesar's Hamon Bubble Launcher using the wires on his headgear to unleash a wind that pops all of the bubbles, leaving Caesar temporarily blind in one eye. As Kars and Esidisi head to the surface, Wamuu fights Joseph, slicing through his wrist to make the battle last only a minute. Joseph lands a hit on Wamuu with his Clacker Boomerang, but Wamuu counters with his Divine Sandstorm technique leaving Joseph barely alive. Joseph pretends to run away and tricks Wamuu onto a mine cart ride through the ruins. Wamuu knocks Joseph off the cart, but Joseph proclaims that as the first person to harm Wamuu, he would be strong enough to beat Wamuu in a month's time. Intrigued, Wamuu lets Joseph live, but implants a "Wedding Ring" around Joseph's aorta that will release a deadly poison in 33 days' time, with the antidote held in his lip piercing. Esidisi then implants another poison-filled ring around Joseph's windpipe, with the antidote contained in his nose piercing. The Pillar Men leave in search of the Red Stone of Aja. Caesar now realizes Joseph's resolve and promises to aid him.
16	7	"Lisa Lisa, Hamon Coach"; Transliteration: "Hamon Kyōshi Risa Risa" (Japanese: 波紋教師リサリサ)	Kōtarō Togoshi	Kazuyuki Fudeyasu	Kōtarō Togoshi	January 26, 2013	February 12, 2017
Wanting to teach Joseph to control his Hamon, Caesar takes him to Venice to meet Caesar's Hamon coach Lisa Lisa. Lisa Lisa orders Joseph to wear a mask that limits his breathing for the duration of his training to better focus his Hamon. Lisa Lisa tasks Joseph and Caesar to the nearby Air Suplena Island to climb the Hell Climb Pillar, a 24-meter pillar covered in oil they can only climb using Hamon. Observing Caesar's efforts, Joseph learns to climb up by focusing Hamon energy into just his fingertips. As the days pass, Joseph assumes a crack in the pillar is an easy break, but this turns out to be a trap, causing the pillar to start spewing oil out horizontally at high pressure at its 20-meter mark. Caesar passes through by using Hamon energy to simultaneously grip the pillar with his feet and repel the barrier, eventually reaching the peak. Joseph gets past by traveling across the oil barrier to its weakest point so he can leap over it, but as he runs out of breath at the last meter, Caesar helps him up.
17	8	"The Deeper Plan"; Transliteration: "Fukaku Wana o Hare!" (Japanese: 深く罠をはれ！)	Yūta Takamura	Kazuyuki Fudeyasu	Taizō Yoshida	February 2, 2013	February 19, 2017
Lisa Lisa explains that Kars is seeking a perfectly cut gemstone possessed by Lisa Lisa known as the Red Stone of Aja to power the Stone Mask created by Kars to become the ultimate lifeform. Joseph says they should destroy the stone, but Lisa Lisa reveals that according to legend only it can defeat the Pillar Men. With a week left until the poisonous rings inside Joseph kill him, Lisa Lisa pits Joseph and Caesar against Hamon instructors Loggins (Note: In the English dub and subtitles, Loggins is named "Loggs".) and Messina (Note: Messina is known by that name in the English Netflix subtitles, and as "Meshina" in the English Crunchyroll subtitles and the English dub.) respectively for their final lesson. However, Joseph finds Esidisi has killed Loggins. Angered, Joseph confronts Esidisi over a bed of spikes. Thanks to an intricate trap, Joseph uses a wire set-up on Loggins to sever Esidisi's arm. However, Esidisi repairs himself with Loggins' arm before attacking Joseph with the Burning King's Prison, an ability to control the temperature of his burning blood. Joseph ensnares Esidisi in Hamon-conductive wool using sleight of hand and destroys him with a Hamon Overdrive attack. Joseph takes the antidote for the poisonous ring around his windpipe, leaving six days left until Wamuu's poisonous ring dissolves. Joseph heads back to the castle, unaware that Esidisi's nervous system is clinging onto his back.
18	9	"Von Stroheim's Revenge"; Transliteration: "Shutorohaimu-tai no Gyakushū" (Japanese: シュトロハイム隊の逆襲)	Shingo Uchida & Mitsuhiro Yoneda	Shinichi Inotsume	Shingo Uchida	February 9, 2013	February 26, 2017
As Joseph waits to warn Lisa Lisa about the Pillar Men, Esidisi's nervous system takes over the body of Lisa Lisa's assistant Suzi Q (Note: In the English subtitles, Suzi Q is named "Suzie Q".) and sends the Red Stone of Aja off on a boat bound for Venice. Before Joseph and Caesar can pursue the boat, Esidisi stands in their way, knowing full well they cannot kill him without killing Suzi Q as well. As Esidisi boils Suzi Q's blood to kill everyone in the room, Joseph and Caesar combine their Hamon in opposing forces, forcing Esidisi's nervous system to safely release Suzi Q before burning away while exposed to sunlight. After healing Suzi Q, Lisa Lisa learns from her that the Red Stone of Aja has been sent to St. Moritz in Switzerland, where Kars and Wamuu are waiting. Joseph promises Suzi Q that he will see her again before he, Caesar, Lisa Lisa, and Messina head off to catch up to the mail train bound for Switzerland. When the group catches up to the train at customs, Wehrmacht soldiers led by Stroheim, rebuilt as a cyborg, arrive and claim the Red Stone of Aja for themselves, inviting Joseph and the others to join them at their lodge. Kars attacks the lodge.
19	10	"A Race Toward the Brink"; Transliteration: "Shi no Gake e Tsuppashire" (Japanese: 死の崖へつっ走れ)	Masashi Abe	Shinichi Inotsume	Masashi Abe	February 16, 2013	March 5, 2017
Stroheim shoots Kars with the machine gun in his mechanical torso. Kars' Brilliant Bone Blade ability, a series of fast moving jagged blades on his arm, cuts through the bullets and Stroheim's body. Kars attempts to retrieve the Red Stone of Aja, but Stroheim fires a beam of ultraviolet light at him, sending the Red Stone of Aja sliding towards a cliff edge. Joseph and Kars chase after it and although Joseph grabs the stone, Kars pulls him off the cliff with him, wanting revenge for Esidisi's death. Knowing that Kars would not break the stone, Joseph uses the Red Stone of Aja as a shield and prevents his fall by chaining a series of icicles together which Caesar uses to pull him up to safety. Kars lands safely far below, before heading to his daytime hideout. The next day, after fighting with Joseph over conflicting approaches, Caesar heads to the abandoned hotel believed to be Kars' hideout by himself. Lisa Lisa orders Messina to follow him.
20	11	"Young Caesar"; Transliteration: "Shīzā Kodoku no Seishun" (Japanese: シーザー孤独の青春)	Toshiyuki Katō	Yasuko Kobayashi	Toshiyuki Katō	February 23, 2013	March 12, 2017
When Caesar was ten, his Hamon-using father Mario left him without a word to fight the Pillar Men. When Caesar was 16, he encountered his father in Rome and came across the wall containing the Pillar Men that was rigged with a trap. Mario, failing to recognize his son, died saving Caesar. In his last moments, Mario instructed Caesar to speak to Lisa Lisa, which Mario believed was the only person who could stop the Pillar Men. Caesar then sought to avenge his family. In 1939, (Note: Episode 26, "The Ascendant One", places the fights with Esidisi, Wamuu, and Kars in 1939.) Caesar and Messina arrive at the hotel and Caesar is attacked outside by Wamuu who refracts the sunlight around himself with wind. Wamuu wounds Messina and drags him into the hotel, prompting Caesar to go in after him. Using his new Bubble Cutter attack and a series of refractive bubble lenses, Caesar wounds Wamuu and redirects the sunlight inside the hotel to pin him down. However, when Caesar's shadow covers the sunlight, Wamuu critically wounds him with Divine Sandstorm. Caesar uses the last of his strength to steal Wamuu's piercing into a blood bubble before being crushed by the collapsing ceiling. Wamuu, respecting Caesar's resolve, allows the bubble to remain for Joseph.
21	12	"A Hundred Against Two"; Transliteration: "Hyaku tai Ni no Kakehiki" (Japanese: 100(ひゃく)対2(に)のかけひき)	Hitomi Ezoe	Shōgo Yasukawa	Hitomi Ezoe & Yukio Nishimoto	March 2, 2013	March 19, 2017
Following Wamuu's trail of blood, Joseph and Lisa Lisa encounter a vampire named Wired Beck. Lisa Lisa easily defeats him using her Hamon-empowered scarf. As a promise to Caesar, Joseph states he will not take the antidote until he has beaten Wamuu. Joseph and Lisa Lisa encounter Wamuu and Kars, along with a hundred vampire minions. Lisa Lisa holds off their attack, bluffing that if she and Joseph are killed, a time bomb will destroy the Red Stone of Aja. She proposes that Joseph fight Wamuu whilst she fights Kars with the Red Stone of Aja on the line. Wamuu and Kars arrange a place for the battle at midnight, keeping Lisa Lisa as insurance. Whilst retrieving the Red Stone of Aja, Joseph finds a picture of Erina from 1889 with Speedwagon, Straizo, and an infant. Upon meeting at the arena, Lisa Lisa reveals that she was the baby that Erina rescued from the ship and was raised by Straizo who taught her Hamon and gave her the Red Stone of Aja. Joseph and Wamuu's battle is revealed to be a chariot race using vampire horses. Joseph puts on Caesar's bandana and prepares to do battle.
22	13	"A True Warrior"; Transliteration: "Shin no Kakutō-sha" (Japanese: 真の格闘者)	Naomi Nakayama	Shinichi Inotsume	Shin Misawa	March 9, 2013	March 26, 2017
Before Joseph and Wamuu's race begins, it is revealed that during each lap, there will be a different weapon for whoever can grab it from a pillar first. Joseph grabs a sledgehammer from the first pillar. However, Wamuu grabs hold of the pillar itself, forcing Joseph to abandon his chariot, although Joseph uses the hammer to avoid being trampled by Wamuu's horses. Wamuu launches an attack on Joseph by hiding within his horse, but Joseph turns Wamuu's Divine Sandstorm attack back against him with Hamon. Wamuu gouges out his eyes and grows a horn that can sense the wind. The second lap offers a pair of crossbows. Joseph picks up one that is too big for him to use whilst Wamuu uses the wind to guide his shots with a smaller crossbow. Wamuu hits Joseph's sides with a reflected shot. As he is thrown to the ground, Joseph cocks his crossbow using the momentum of the fall. Joseph hits Wamuu with a Hamon-charged shot from his crossbow by distracting his senses with pebbles. Wamuu fires his severed arms at Joseph to cut off his breathing, preventing him from using Hamon, before gathering up wind for his Final Mode, (Note: The term "Final Mode" is named "ultimate mastery" in the English dub and the English Crunchyroll subtitles, and a "final attack" in the English Netflix subtitles.) Gathering Gale. (Note: Gathering Gale is named "Atmospheric Rift" in the English dub and subtitles.)
23	14	"The Warrior of Wind"; Transliteration: "Kaze ni Kaeru Senshi" (Japanese: 風にかえる戦士)	Jirō Fujimoto	Kazuyuki Fudeyasu	Taizō Yoshida	March 16, 2013	April 2, 2017
Launching his Gathering Gale attack, Wamuu fires a stream of wind capable of cutting stone towards Joseph. After a failed attempt with a firebomb, Joseph strikes Wamuu with Caesar's flaming bandana, which Wamuu shreds with his wind. However, Wamuu breathes in both the oil from the bomb and the burning embers of Caesar's bandana causing him to explode. When the other vampires suddenly attack, Wamuu uses the last of his strength to kill them, not wanting them to interfere. Wamuu requests that Joseph drinks the antidote from his ring, before dying. Kars dupes Lisa Lisa into fighting a vampire body double as the real Kars attacks her from behind. After claiming the Red Stone of Aja for himself, Kars sends his vampire army after the weakened Joseph, but he is rescued by Stroheim and his men, along with the Speedwagon Foundation and Smokey, using ultraviolet lights to fight off the vampires. Joseph faces Kars who dangles Lisa Lisa's unconscious body over a bed of sharp crystals forcing Joseph into a vulnerable position. Smokey realizes that Joseph does not yet know that Lisa Lisa is his mother.
24	15	"The Ties That Bind JoJo"; Transliteration: "JoJo o Musubu Kizuna" (Japanese: JOJOを結ぶ絆)	Satoshi Ōsedo	Yasuko Kobayashi	Satoshi Ōsedo	March 23, 2013	April 9, 2017
Lisa Lisa's real name is revealed to be Elizabeth. When Joseph was a baby, a zombie servant of Dio that survived the events of 1889 murdered Joseph's father George and covered up his death. George's wife Elizabeth killed the zombie, but as the zombie was a beloved commander in the Royal Flying Corps, Elizabeth was branded a criminal. The Speedwagon Foundation erased her identity, and she left Joseph behind in England to be raised by Erina, before escaping to Venice under the alias Lisa Lisa. Erina kept Joseph's past a secret so he would avoid the fate that befell his father and grandfather in the battle between Hamon and the Stone Masks. In 1939, Joseph is forced to cling onto a rope to stop Lisa Lisa from falling to her death. He sets his scarf on fire, stating he will finish Kars off before it fully burns. Kars cuts the rope, but he falls into a trap laid by Joseph, who hits him with a Hamon attack, impaling him on the sharp crystals below. Joseph rescues Lisa Lisa. Stroheim attempts to finish off Kars with multiple blasts of an ultraviolet beam, but Kars secretly puts on the Stone Mask with the Red Stone of Aja in place. The artificial sunlight channels through the Red Stone of Aja and into Kars.
25	16	"The Birth of a Superbeing"; Transliteration: "Chō Seibutsu no Tanjō!!" (Japanese: 超生物の誕生!!)	Kenichi Suzuki	Yasuko Kobayashi	Kenichi Suzuki	March 30, 2013	April 16, 2017
Kars turns into the ultimate life form and demonstrates his new powers to manipulate his body at a genetic level. The sun rises, killing the rest of the vampire minions, but Kars remains immune. Joseph grabs the Red Stone of Aja and runs off with Kars in pursuit, Kars transforming into a bird-like creature. Joseph takes one of the German planes to lure Kars away from the others and hopes that he may be able to destroy Kars by forcing him into a volcanic island. Kars attacks Joseph's plane in various ways causing it to go out of control, but Joseph drops his parachute carrying a dummy to lure Kars into the path of the plane. Joseph then flies the plane towards the volcano's crater with Kars trapped on the nose. Kars attempts to escape but Stroheim, who had jumped on board earlier, stops him and rescues Joseph before the plane crashes into the magma. Joseph and Stroheim land safely but they see that Kars is still alive within the magma.
26	17	"The Ascendant One"; Transliteration: "Kami to Natta Otoko" (Japanese: 神となった男)	Toshiyuki Katō	Yasuko Kobayashi	Toshiyuki Katō	April 6, 2013	April 16, 2017
10,000 years ago, Kars invented the Stone Mask to become immortal. Kars slaughtered all but three of his race after they turned against him. On February 28, 1939, Kars blocks the magma with an insulating layer of air bubbles and emerges, slicing off Joseph's hand. Joseph subconsciously holds up the Red Stone of Aja, which magnifies the energy into the volcano causing it to erupt. Joseph and Kars are blasted into the air on a large rock. Joseph's severed arm hits Kars and distracts him long enough to be launched into space by more flying rocks. Kars attempts to return to Earth, but his body freezes solid and he is left to drift in space for eternity. Landing in the ocean, Joseph is rescued by a fishing boat. In Venice, Suzi Q nurses Joseph to health and they marry. Joseph receives a prosthetic hand from Stroheim and later shows up at his own funeral, having been presumed dead by everyone else. In the aftermath, Lisa Lisa would remarry and later move to America with Joseph and Suzi Q. Stroheim is killed in action in Stalingrad in 1943, while Erina and Speedwagon pass from old age in 1950 and 1952 respectively. Smokey becomes the first black mayor in his home state of Georgia. In 1983, a "treasure chest" engraved with the name "Dio" is salvaged in the water near the Canary Islands. At JFK Airport in 1987, Joseph is about to depart for Tokyo to see his daughter. In a post-credits scene, a young man in school uniform sits in a jail cell.

== Voice cast ==
Character	Japanese	English	Phantom Blood	Battle Tendency
Jonathan Joestar	Kazuyuki Okitsu	Johnny Yong Bosch	✓	✗
Joseph Joestar	Tomokazu Sugita	Ben Diskin	✗	✓
Joseph Joestar	Tomokazu Sugita	Richard Epcar (epilogue)	✗	✓
Dio Brando	Takehito Koyasu	Patrick Seitz	✓	✗
George Joestar I	Masashi Sugawara	Marc Diraison	✓	✗
Erina Joestar (née Pendleton)	Ayako Kawasumi	Michelle Ruff	✓	✓
Robert E. O. Speedwagon	Yōji Ueda	Keith Silverstein	✓	✓
Will A. Zeppeli	Yoku Shioya	Joe Ochman	✓	✗
Caesar A. Zeppeli	Takuya Satō	Bryce Papenbrook	✗	✓
Rudol von Stroheim	Atsushi Imaruoka	Dan Woren	✗	✓
Lisa Lisa	Atsuko Tanaka	Wendee Lee	✓ (Baby)	✓
Smokey Brown	Yū Hayashi	Robbie Daymond	✗	✓
Suzi Q	Sachiko Kojima	Stephanie Sheh	✗	✓
Poco	Yumiko Kobayashi	Amanda C. Miller	✓	✗
Tonpetty	Tamio Ōki	Geoffrey Chalmers	✓	✗
Dire	Taketora	George C. Cole	✓	✗
Straizo	Nobuo Tobita	Dave Mallow	✓	✓
Kars	Kazuhiko Inoue	John DeMita	✗	✓
Esidisi	Keiji Fujiwara	Chris Jai Alex	✗	✓
Wamuu	Akio Ōtsuka	Paul St. Peter	✗	✓
Santana	Kenji Nomura	Kaiji Tang	✗	✓
Wired Beck	Satoshi Tsuruoka	Tom Fahn	✗	✓
Narrator	Tōru Ōkawa	David Vincent	✓	✓

== Music ==
The first season of JoJo's Bizarre Adventure uses three pieces of theme music, two opening themes and one ending theme. The first opening theme is the song "JoJo (Sono Chi no Sadame)" (ジョジョ～その血の運命～; lit. 'JoJo (The Blood's Destiny)') performed by Hiroaki "Tommy" Tominaga, vocalist of Japanese "brass rock" band Bluff, as the opening theme for the Part 1 episodes. The score for Part 1 was composed by Hayato Matsuo, and was released in two parts as Destiny, a bonus disc in the first Blu-ray box set released on January 30, 2013, and Future, a separate CD release on February 22, 2013. Future debuted at number 95 on the Billboard Japan Top Albums charts and peaked at 115 on the Oricon Weekly Album Charts. The opening theme song for the Part 2 episodes is "Bloody Stream" by Coda. Its score is composed by Taku Iwasaki, and was released in two parts as Musik (German for "Music"), a standalone CD release on March 29, 2013, and as Leicht Verwendbar (German for "Light User" (Note: The album title uses the wrong translation of "light", with "leicht" meaning "light" as in weight rather than "Licht" meaning "light" as in a source of illumination. Similarly, "verwendbar" translates as "usable", with the phrase "leicht verwendbar" actually meaning "easy to use.")), a bonus disc for volume 4 on April 26, 2013. Musik debuted at number 63 on the Japan Top Albums charts and at 89 on the Weekly Album Charts. The ending theme for the whole season is British progressive rock band Yes' 1972 single "Roundabout".

== Home media release ==
=== Japanese ===
==== Volume ====
Warner Bros. Japan (Japan – Region 2/A)
Part	Vol.	Episodes	Release date	Ref.
Phantom Blood	1	1–3	January 30, 2013	
Phantom Blood	2	4–6	February 22, 2013	
Phantom Blood	3	7–9	March 29, 2013	
Battle Tendency	4	10–12	April 26, 2013	
Battle Tendency	5	13–15	May 31, 2013	
Battle Tendency	6	16–18	June 28, 2013	
Battle Tendency	7	19–21	July 27, 2013	
Battle Tendency	8	22–24	August 30, 2013	
Battle Tendency	9	25–26	August 30, 2013	

==== Box set ====
Warner Bros. Japan (Japan – Region 2/A)
Part	Discs	Episodes	Release date	Ref.
Phantom Blood	2	1–9	September 13, 2017	
Battle Tendency	3	10–26	September 27, 2017	

=== English ===
Warner Bros. (North America – Region 1/A)
Part	Discs	Episodes	Release date	Ref.
Phantom Blood	3	1–9	September 22, 2015	
Battle Tendency	3	10–26	September 22, 2015	

Viz Media (North America – Region 1/A)
Part	Discs	Episodes	Release date	Ref.
Phantom Blood	4	1–9	August 8, 2017	
Battle Tendency	4	10–26	August 8, 2017	
