= JoJo (Sono Chi no Sadame) =

Theme song of JoJo's Bizarre Adventure: Phantom Blood, by Hiroaki "Tommy" Tominaga

- Cover art featuring Jonathan Joestar (foreground) and Dio Brando (background)

Single by Hiroaki "Tommy" Tominaga
- Released: November 21, 2012
- Length: 4:23
- Label: Warner Home Video
- Songwriters: Shoko Fujibayashi, Kohei Tanaka, Kow Otani

JoJo's Bizarre Adventure theme song singles chronology
"JoJo (Sono Chi no Sadame)" (2012)	"Bloody Stream" (2013)

"JoJo (Sono Chi no Sadame)" (ジョジョ～その血の運命(さだめ)～; lit. 'JoJo (The Fate of that Blood)') is the debut solo release of Hiroaki "Tommy" Tominaga, of Japanese "brass rock" band Bluff and written by Shoko Fujibayashi, composed by Kohei Tanaka, and arranged by Kow Otani. It is used as the first opening theme for the 2012 anime adaptation of the 1987 manga JoJo's Bizarre Adventure, representing the manga's first arc Phantom Blood. Both Fujibayashi and Tanaka are noted for their contributions to theme songs, having previously worked together on "We Are!" for One Piece.

Tominaga's vocals and the accompanying brass band were said to make the whole song an "anime song groove" that harkens back to much older and loved theme songs. The lyrics resonated well with the story of Phantom Blood, and Jun Yamamoto for Billboard said he "could almost feel the passion and ambition that Jonathan Joestar had in his fight against Dio Brando".

"JoJo (Sono Chi no Sadame)" did moderately well in the charts, peaking at 14 on the Oricon's Weekly Album Charts. On Billboard's Japan Hot 100, it debuted at 52 and peaked at 19; on the Japan Hot Animation chart, it debuted and peaked at 5; and on the Japan Hot Singles Sales it debuted and peaked at 10, but as of February 25, 2013, it remains on the chart, having done so for 12 weeks. When subsequent theme song "Bloody Stream" by Coda entered the charts, "JoJo (Sono Chi no Sadame)" was seen on the Oricon to jump from a ranking of 65 to 41 in one week.

== Track listing ==
All lyrics are written by Shoko Fujibayashi; all music is composed by Kohei Tanaka, all arrangement by Kow Otani.

No.	Title	Length
1.	"JoJo ~Sono Chi no Sadame~" (ジョジョ～その血の運命(さだめ)～)	4:23
2.	"JoJo ~Sono Chi no Sadame~" (ORIGINAL KARAOKE)	4:23
Total length:		8:46
