= Battle Tendency =

Second story arc of JoJo's Bizarre Adventure

- Cover of JoJo's Bizarre Adventure volume 8, featuring the Pillar Men (left to right: Wamuu, Esidisi, and Kars) and Joseph Joestar (foreground)

戦闘潮流 (Sentō Chōryū)
- Genre: Adventure, supernatural
- Manga
- Written by: Hirohiko Araki
- Published by: Shueisha
- English publisher: NA: Viz Media
- Imprint: Jump Comics
- Magazine: Weekly Shōnen Jump
- Original run: November 2, 1987 – March 27, 1989
- Volumes: 7
- Other media
- Animated TV series (2012–2013)
- Chronology
- Preceded by: Phantom Blood; Followed by: Stardust Crusaders
- icon

Battle Tendency (Japanese: 戦闘潮流, Hepburn: Sentō Chōryū) is the second main story arc of the manga series JoJo's Bizarre Adventure written and illustrated by Hirohiko Araki. It was serialized for around 1 1/2 years in Shueisha's Weekly Shōnen Jump from November 2, 1987, to March 27, 1989, for 69 chapters, which were later collected into seven tankōbon volumes. In its original publication, it was referred to as JoJo's Bizarre Adventure Part 2 Joseph Joestar: His Proud Lineage (ジョジョの奇妙な冒険 第二部 ジョセフ・ジョースター —その誇り高き血統, JoJo no Kimyō na Bōken Dai Ni Bu Josefu Jōsutā Sono Hokoritakaki Kettō). The arc was preceded by Phantom Blood (1987) and followed by Stardust Crusaders (1989–1992).

Set in North America and Europe in 1938–39 around 50 years after Phantom Blood, the story follows Joseph Joestar and Caesar Anthonio Zeppeli, the grandsons of Jonathan Joestar and Will A. Zeppeli from Phantom Blood respectively who can manipulate sunlight-based energy called Hamon. Along with the Hamon master Lisa Lisa, Joseph and Caesar seek to prevent ancient humanoids called the Pillar Men, who invented the stone masks from Phantom Blood, from obtaining a powerful stone called the Super Aja, which would evolve them into ultimate beings and conquer their vulnerability to sunlight.

In 2012, Battle Tendency was digitally colored and released as digital downloads for smartphones and tablet computers. A four-volume re-release under the title JoJonium was published in 2014. This version was licensed and released in North America by Viz Media in 2015 and 2016.

Battle Tendency was adapted as part of the first season of David Production's 2012 anime television series JoJo's Bizarre Adventure.

== Plot ==
In the series' backstory, 102,000 years ago in a place that would be modern-day Mexico, it started with a mysterious but powerful race with incredibly long lifespans and the ability to absorb life forces from plants and animals, although they had the disadvantage of being easily disintegrated if exposed to sunlight and thus lived underground instead. Kars, a member of this race, who is known as a Pillar Man, created a stone mask which grants immortality by absorbing life energy to conquer the sun (which kills his kind). He slaughtered all but three of the tribe. As the Pillar Men's bodies were already immortal, they required more power for them to become ultimate beings. In 39 AD, three of the Pillar Men, Kars, Wamuu, and Esidisi, came to the Roman Empire to find a perfectly cut Red Stone of Aja (Note: エイジャの赤石, Eija no Sekiseki) known as the Super Aja. (Note: スーパーエイジャ, Sūpā Eija) Kars, Wamuu, and Esidisi developed fighting styles to counter Hamon, an energy with the same properties as the energy from sunlight, and nearly wiped out the Hamon tribe, but the stone narrowly escaped them. Following this, the Pillar Men went into an almost 2,000-year slumber.

In 1889, Erina Joestar's husband Jonathan was killed by Dio Brando on a ship in the Atlantic Ocean. Erina survived and saved the life of a baby girl, whose parents were killed by the stone mask. (Note: Jonathan's death and Elizabeth's rescue is depicted in the previous part, Phantom Blood.) The girl, Elizabeth, was raised by the Hamon master Straizo, who taught her to use Hamon and gave her the Super Aja. Elizabeth married Erina's son George and they had a son called Joseph. When Joseph was a baby, George was killed by a zombie that blended in as a commander of the Royal Flying Corps and his death was covered up. Upon killing the zombie in an act of revenge, a warrant for Elizabeth's arrest was sent out. She went into hiding and adopted the alias Lisa Lisa. Joseph was raised by Erina. He inherited Hamon abilities from Jonathan.

At the start of the series, in the fall of 1938 where World War II looms, Joseph and Erina move from London to New York. Meanwhile, former thug turned oil baron Robert E. O. Speedwagon invites Straizo to Mexico to destroy a sleeping Pillar Man with Hamon. Straizo instead wounds Speedwagon, and uses a stone mask near the Pillar Man and Speedwagon's blood to become an immortal vampire. Straizo goes to New York to destroy Joseph and Erina, believed to be the last people who know about the stone mask. When Joseph defeats Straizo, Straizo tells him that the Pillar Man is about to awaken and he will meet the Pillar Man soon. Straizo then commits suicide by channeling Hamon through himself, destroying his vampire body. Intrigued, Joseph goes to Mexico and is informed that Speedwagon was taken to detention by the Nazis, who also hold the ambition to study the Pillar Men to serve Adolf Hitler's world conquest. Joseph saves Speedwagon, who survived, from the awakened Pillar Man named Santana, (Note: In the Viz Media translation, Santana is named "Santviento".) and with the help of Rudol von Stroheim, the Nazi Major wounded by Santana, tricks Santana into being turned to stone by the sunlight reflected from a well.

Joseph and Speedwagon travel to Rome, where they meet Caesar Zeppeli, a man who trained in Hamon to continue the legacy of his father Mario and grandfather Will. However, the group arrives too late to prevent Kars, Wamuu, and Esidisi from awakening. Joseph plays on Wamuu's pride and convinces Wamuu to let him live to be a more worthy opponent. Both Wamuu and Esidisi implant poison-filled rings in his aorta and windpipe, giving Joseph 33 days to get the antidotes from each of them.

Joseph and Caesar train in Hamon under Lisa Lisa on Air Suplena Island off the coast of Venice. Esidisi raids the island and is challenged by Joseph. Joseph destroys Esidisi's body and takes his antidote, but Esidisi's brain is able to possess Lisa Lisa's handmaid, Suzi Q, to steal the Super Aja and ship it off to Kars and Wammu. Joseph and Caesar work together to purge Esidisi's influence from Suzi Q and destroy him for good. The group tracks down Kars and Wamuu to Switzerland. Caesar is killed fighting Wamuu one-on-one, and takes the antidote for Joseph before dying. Joseph and Lisa Lisa then confront Kars and Wamuu for the Super Aja, Lisa Lisa bluffing that she has a timed explosive that will destroy the stone. Joseph kills Wamuu in battle.

On February 28, 1939, Kars acquires the Super Aja and uses it along with the stone mask to become the ultimate being, despite efforts by Joseph and his newfound allies von Stroheim to prevent it. Now immune to the sun and able to use Hamon, Kars's only desire is to kill Joseph. Joseph steals a Nazi plane and tries to crash it and Kars into the volcanic island of Vulcano. Joseph and Kars escape, but the shock of the plane crash causes a volcanic eruption. Kars attempts to kill Joseph with Hamon, but Joseph instinctively holds up the Super Aja, which causes the energy to prompt an eruption climax, sending Joseph and Kars flying into the sky on a large rock. Kars is knocked into space by volcanic debris. He tries to return to Earth, but his body freezes over and turns to stone. Unable to perish even though he desperately wants to, he drifts through space for eternity, eventually ceasing to think. Returning to Earth, Joseph is nursed to health by Lisa Lisa's assistant Suzi Q, (Note: In chapters 37–39 of the Viz Media translation, Suzi Q is spelled as "Suzie Q".) whom he marries. In the epilogue, set in 1987, an aged Joseph takes a flight from John F. Kennedy International Airport to Japan, where his daughter and grandson live, directly leading in to the first chapters of the following story arc, Stardust Crusaders.

== Characters ==
- Joseph Joestar (Note: ジョセフ・ジョースター, Josefu Jōsutā) is the main protagonist and grandson of Jonathan Joestar. Like Jonathan, he can use Hamon, though he is not initially as skilled in its use as Jonathan was. He initially uses a pair of Hamon-empowered clackers in battle, but he relies more on his wits than brute strength in fights, employing his uncanny ability to predict his opponent's actions down to what they will say next. Joseph makes return appearances in Stardust Crusaders and Diamond Is Unbreakable.
- Caesar Anthonio Zeppeli (Note: シーザー・アントニオ・ツェペリ, Shīzā Antonio Tseperi) is a suave ladies' man and the grandson of Jonathan Joestar's teacher Will A. Zeppeli. He is rather cool and collected, especially compared to Joseph, with whom he is grudgingly paired to fight the Pillar Men. But over time, Joseph starts to grow on him so much that he is able to understand his strange thought patterns and they form an unbeatable duo. He infuses the Hamon into soap bubbles he creates with his specially-made gloves. Caesar dies near the end, in way like his grandfather, giving Joseph the last of his "Hamon" to help him defeat the rest of the pillar men.
- Lisa Lisa, (Note: リサリサ, Risarisa) formerly Elizabeth, (Note: エリザベス, Erizabesu) is a mysterious Hamon master who lives in Venice. She is introduced as Caesar's Hamon teacher and later revealed to be the last surviving master of the Hamon Tribe as well as Joseph's mother. She fights by conducting Hamon through her specially made scarf, that was made with the yarn of the Satiporoja beetle, that can conduct Hamon at 100%. Wife of the late George Joestar II, Joseph's father.
- Smokey Brown (Note: スモーキー・ブラウン, Sumōkī Buraun) is an ordinary pickpocket hailing from New York whose newfound friendship with Joseph Joestar places him at the spectator's seat of the battle against the Pillar Men.
- Robert E. O. Speedwagon (Note: ロバート・E・O・スピードワゴン, Robāto Ī Ō Supīdowagon) is an ally of Joseph and an old friend of the Joestars. Since the events of Phantom Blood, Speedwagon has settled in America, where he became an oil tycoon and founded the Speedwagon Foundation in order to deal with paranormal threats such as the Stone Mask and, later, the Pillar Men.
- Rudol von Stroheim (Note: ルドル・フォン・シュトロハイム, Rudoru Fon Shutorohaimu) is the commander of the Nazi forces who discovered Santana in Mexico. He is responsible for not only saving the life of Speedwagon, but also for trying to help Joseph defeat Santana by blowing himself up along with him. He returns later as a cyborg to assist in the fight against Kars and his army. He eventually dies in 1943 during the Battle of Stalingrad.
- Esidisi (Note: エシディシ, Eshidishi) is one of the Pillar Men. Like the other Pillar Men, he uses a particular fighting style known as a "Mode". Esidisi's Heat Control Mode (Note: 怪焔王の流法(モード), Kaiennō no Mōdo) allows him to make his blood boil at 500 °C (932 °F) and inject it into his foes to burn them alive by extending his needle-like blood vessels out of his own body.
- Wamuu (Note: ワムウ, Wamū) is one of the Pillar Men and Kars' loyal servant, following a warrior's code of honor. His Wind Mode (Note: 風の流法(モード), Kaze no Mōdo) allows him to control the air in his lungs, which he can use to blast his opponents, cut them with extremely fast gusts, or render himself invisible.
- Kars (Note: カーズ, Kāzu) is the main antagonist of Battle Tendency as well as the leader of the Pillar Men and the creator of the stone masks. He uses Light Mode, (Note: 光の流法(モード), Hikari no Mōdo) which allows him to produce saw-bladed appendages from his body which produce a radiant glow. He is intelligent and ruthless, and single minded in his dedication to become the ultimate being. (Note: 究極生命体(アルティメット・シイング), Arutimetto Shiingu; lit. "ultimate thing") Though Kars succeeds, his obsession with killing Joseph leads to his defeat, as he ends up being knocked out of Earth's orbit and frozen in space. Unable to die even though he desperately wants to, he eventually chooses to stop thinking.
- Santana is one of the Pillar Men. He was discovered by the Nazis in Mexico. Although he does not have a Mode, he is able to manipulate his body, allowing him to squeeze into tiny spaces and use his ribs as blades. He can also absorb other people into his own body. When awakened, Santana attempted to absorb Joseph Joestar and Stroheim, but he was turned into stone by the sun.

== Production ==
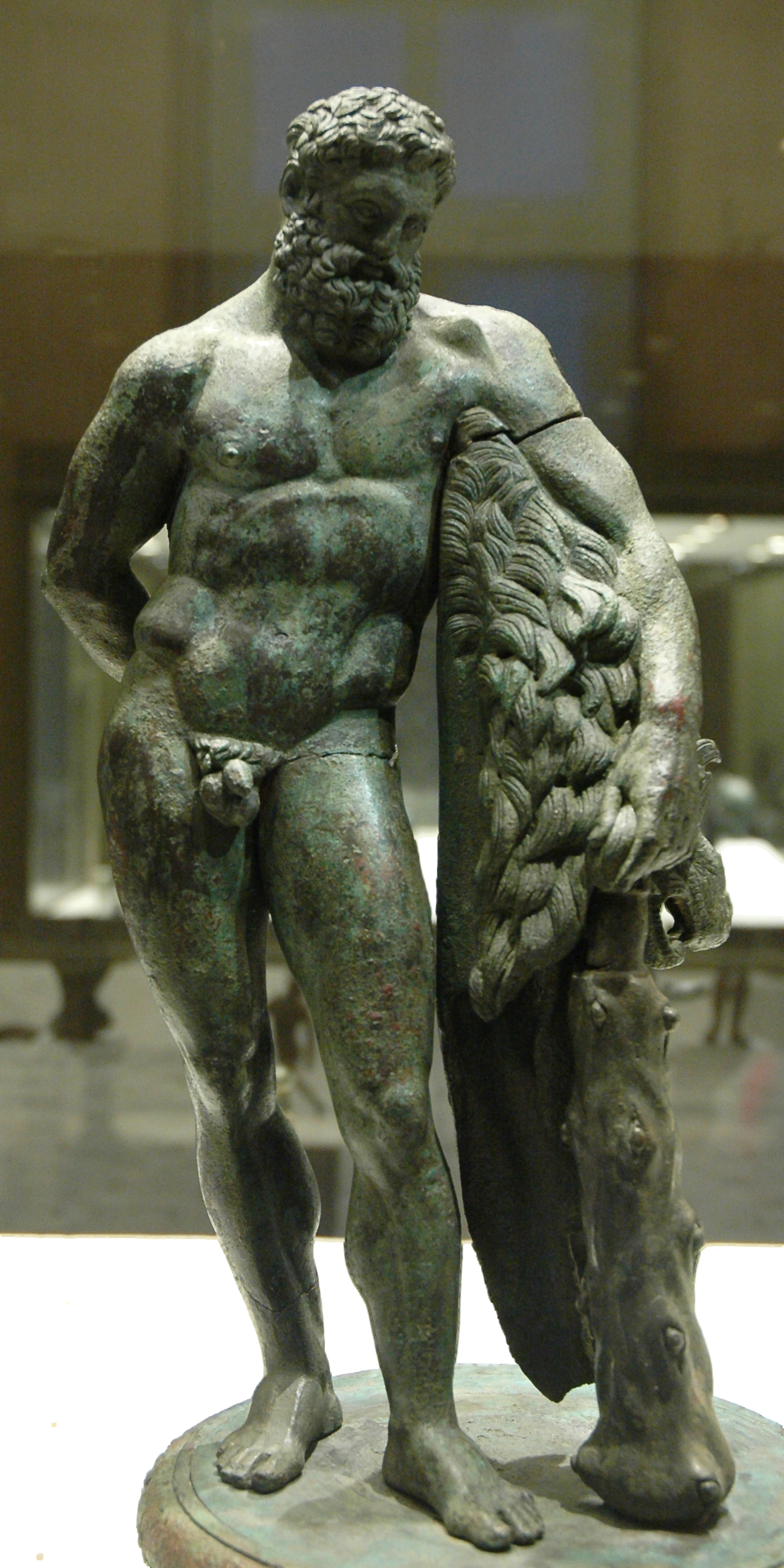
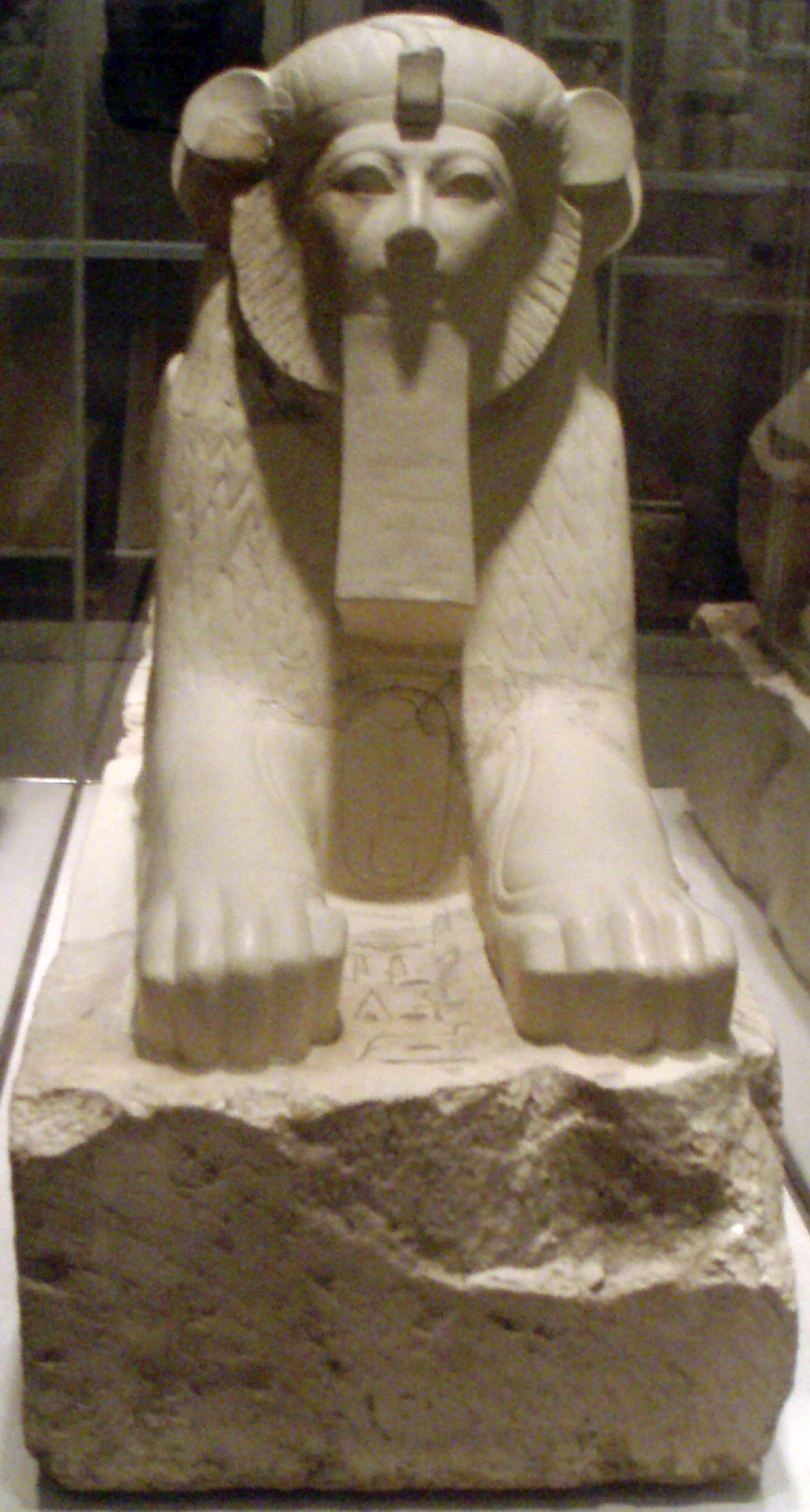
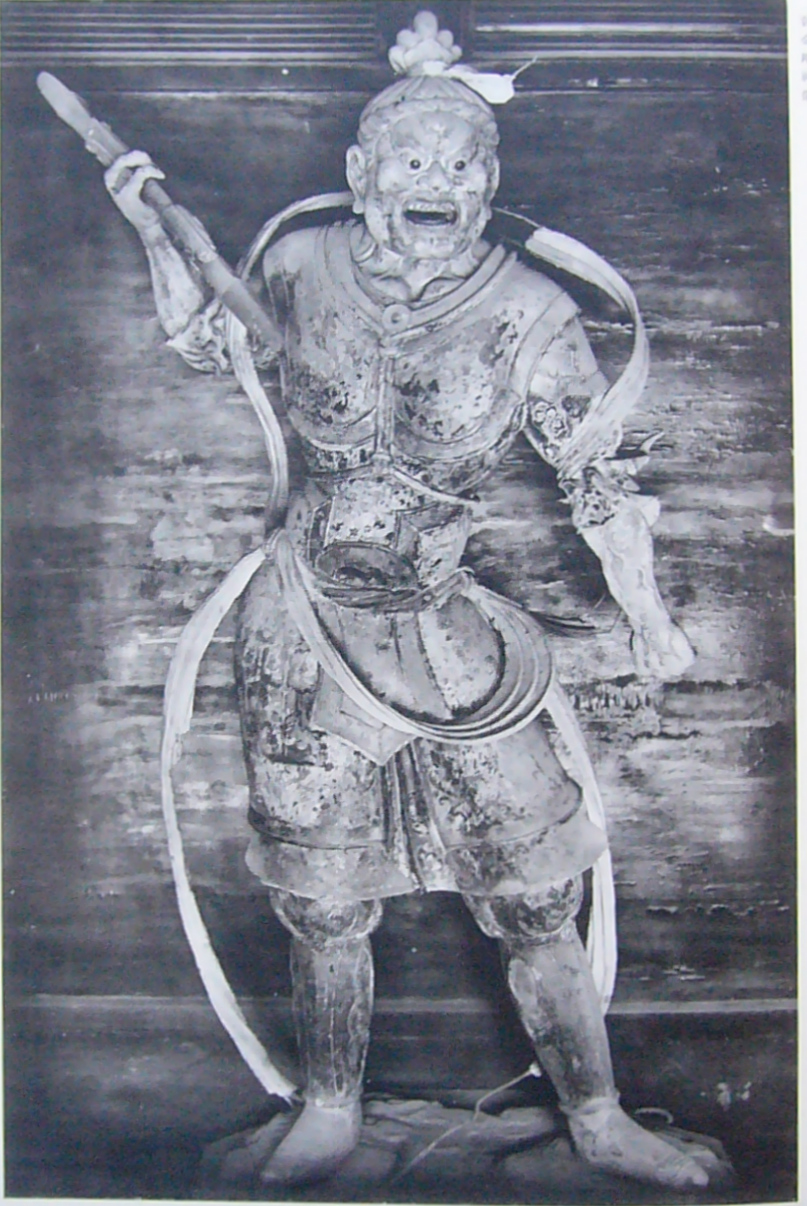
Araki drew from Roman statues, Egyptian sphinxes, and Japanese nio statues when designing the Pillar Men to convey them as godlike.

Because it was "unprecedented" to kill off the main character in a Weekly Shōnen Jump manga in 1987, Hirohiko Araki made the protagonist of Battle Tendency look very similar to Part 1's Jonathan, but with a more adventurous and confrontational personality. Araki called Joseph a swindler in comparison to the gentlemanly Jonathan, because he is constantly looking to win and will do insane things without hesitation. This was not only to create contrast between the two, but also because the author wanted to shift from the physical battles in Part 1 to more "cerebral" fights. He wanted Joseph to be a shōnen manga hero who bends the rules as he fights, like the protagonist of his earlier series Cool Shock B.T., winning by cunning and logic, instead of bravery and perseverance.

Having not been able to show a friendly rivalry between Jonathan and Dio Brando in Part 1, Araki introduced Caesar Zeppeli to present a more positive friendly rivalry between him and Joseph since Weekly Shōnen Jump is a shōnen magazine. Because Joseph and Caesar both inherited the bloodlines of their grandfathers, the author wanted to connect their individual Hamon abilities to their last names. Thus he gave Joseph a "trickster" style, and Caesar the seemingly fleeting-bubbles as a "representation of his fate and the burden he is carrying." Having never been a fan of the main character receiving some unbeatable ability, Araki enjoys giving characters weapons with faults and having them make up for it with strategy. He noted that the spherical shape of the bubbles allowed him to morph them into discs or use them as lenses. The author also stated that these "spheres" were inherited by both Gyro Zeppeli in Steel Ball Run and Josuke Higashikata in JoJolion.

Araki stated that at the time, female characters in shōnen manga were typically cute and designed to be "a man's ideal woman." He said readers were not interested in realistic portrayals of women, but rather the type of girl "that giggles during a conversation" with heart marks next to her. He believes this made the warrior-type Lisa Lisa feel fresh and "unheard of" in both manga and society in general and said it was exciting to challenge people's expectations with her. Araki also said that the supernatural basis of the fights in his series evened the battlefield for women and children to match up against strong men. This idea that looks are irrelevant in supernatural battles led to the introduction of Stands in Stardust Crusaders. Because the Hamon master in Part 1, Will A. Zeppeli, was very gentle, he wanted to give Lisa Lisa a "sadistic" personality. The author based her on a smart and intimidating neighborhood girl who tutored him in elementary school. He stated that at the time it was hard to get Japanese readers to remember a foreign name, so he chose something with repetition. He also said that Lisa Lisa phonetically resembles Japanese to an extent.

Needing the Pillar Men to surpass Dio, Araki said he had to up the ante to the level of gods, and so based their designs on Roman statues, Egyptian sphinxes and Japanese Nio statues to give them godlike features. Araki designed Kars with a turban to show his superior intelligence and that he is their king. He said that if you compared the Pillar Men to Mito Kōmon, Kars would be Kōmon, Esidisi would be Suke-san, and Wamuu would be Kaku-san. Kars' ability Brilliant Bone Blade is a "Light Mode" because Araki thought a shining blade would be a godlike technique and would visually express that defeating him was impossible. He speculated that many readers were probably reminded of the similar Reskiniharden Saber Phenomenon technique from his series Baoh, and admitted that aspects of Kars' goal to become the ultimate being somewhat overlapped with the earlier work. Visually speaking, Araki also really enjoys drawing flesh and blade merge as something that is only possible in manga.

== Chapters ==
The original volumization and Shueisha's 2002 re-release use different chapter titles. In the original volumization, chapters 45–47 are collected in volume 5, listed on the Phantom Blood page.

=== Original volumization (Jump Comics) ===
No.	Title	Japanese release date	Japanese ISBN
6	JoJo vs. The Ultimate Being; Jojo Tai Kyūkyoku Seibutsu (JoJo Vs.(たい) 究極生物)	October 7, 1988	978-4-08-851062-0
48. "Straizo's Ambition" (ストレイツォの野望, Sutoreitso no Yabō); 49. "Master of the Game" (ゲームの達人, Gēmu no Tatsujin); 50. "The Immortal Monster" (不死身の化け物, Fujimi no Bakemono); 51. "Cold and Cruel, Straizo" (冷酷非情ストレイツォ, Reikoku Hijō Sutoreitso); 52. "Nazis and the 'Pillar Man'" (ナチスと〝柱の男〞, Nachisu to "Hashira no Otoko"); 53. "The 'Pillar Man' Resurrection Project" (〝柱の男〞蘇生実験, "Hashira no Otoko" Sosei Jikken); 54. "The 'Pillar Man' vs. The Stone Mask Man" (〝柱の男〞対石仮面の男, "Hashira no Otoko" Tai Ishi Kamen no Otoko); 55. "The Desert Pursuer" (砂漠の追尾者, Sabaku no Tsuibisha); 56. "Santana Disappears" (消えたサンタナ, Kieta Santana); 57. "JoJo vs. The Ultimate Being" (JoJo Vs.(たい) 究極生物, JoJo Tai Kyūkyoku Seibutsu)
7	The Red Stone of Aja; Eija no Sekiseki (エイジャの赤石)	December 6, 1988	978-4-08-851063-7
58. "Hamon into the Ultimate Being!" (究極生物に波紋!, Kyūkyoku Seibutsu ni Hamon!); 59. "The Perfect Plan!!" (完璧なる作戦ッ!!, Kanpeki naru Sakusen!!); 60. "Stroheim's Resolve" (シュトロハイムの覚悟, Shutorohaimu no Kakugo); 61. "The End of A Proud Man!" (誇り高き男の最期!, Hokori Takaki Otoko no Saigo!); 62. "The Spaghetti Battle" (スパゲッティーの戦い, Supagettī no Tatakai); 63. "The Pigeon and the Girl" (ハトと女の子, Hato to Onna no Ko); 64. "The Red Stone of Aja" (エイジャの赤石, Eija no Sekiseki); 65. "The Truth Within the Mouth of Truth" (真実の口にひそむ真実, Shinjitsu no Kuchi ni Hisomu Shinjitsu); 66. "The Ultimate Warrior Wamuu" (究極戦士ワムウ, Kyūkyoku Senshi Wamū); 67. "Special Attack: JoJo Clackers" (必殺JoJoクラッカー, Hissatsu JoJo Kurakkā)
8	The Final Trial! Saishū Shiren! (最終試練!)	February 10, 1989	978-4-08-851064-4
68. "The 'Blood Timer' Battle" (〝血時計〟の闘い, "Chidokei" no Tatakai); 69. "A Hero's Proof" (ヒーローの資格, Hīrō no Shikaku); 70. "The Wedding Ring of Death" (死の結婚指輪(ウエディングリング), Shi no Uedingu Ringu); 71. "The Venetian Master" (ヴェネチアの達人, Venechia no Tatsujin); 72. "The Training of a Hamon Warrior" (波紋戦士の試練, Hamon Senshi no Shiren); 73. "Concentrated Hamon Power" (一点集中波紋パワー, Itten Shūchū Hamon Pawā); 74. "The All-or-Nothing Gamble!" (一か八かの賭け!, Ichi ka Bachi ka no Kake!); 75. "Hamon Master JoJo" (波紋達人(マスター)JoJo, Hamon Masutā JoJo); 76. "The Final Trial!" (最終試練!, Saishū Shiren!); 77. "The Results of Grueling Training" (しごきの成果, Shigoki no Seika)
9	Race Toward the Cliff of Death; Shi no Gake e Tsuppashire (死の崖へつっ走れ)	April 10, 1989	978-4-08-851065-1
78. "The Eerie Esidisi" (エシディシの不気味, Eshidishi no Bukimi); 79. "Laying a Deeper Trap!" (深く罠をはれ!, Fukaku Wana o Hare!); 80. "An Ensured Victory" (決定されていた勝利, Kettei Sareteita Shōri); 81. "The Lurking Devil!" (忍び寄る魔!, Shinobiyoru Ma!); 82. "The Stolen Body" (奪われた肉体, Ubawareta Nikutai); 83. "Chasing the Red Stone to Switzerland" (スイスに赤石を追え, Suisu ni Sekiseki o Oe); 84. "The Mysterious Nazi Officer" (謎のナチス軍人, Nazo no Nachisu Gunjin); 85. "Kars 'Light Mode'" (カーズ"光の流法(モード)", Kāzu "Hikari no Mōdo"); 86. "Race Toward the Cliff of Death" (死の崖へつっ走れ, Shi no Gake e Tsuppashire)
10	The Crimson Bubble; Senseki no Shabon (鮮赤のシャボン)	June 9, 1989	978-4-08-851066-8
87. "Fight to the Death For 175 Meters" (死闘175m, Shitō Hyaku Nana Jū Go Mētoru); 88. "Caesar: Anger from the Past" (シーザー過去からの怒り, Shīzā Kako kara no Ikari); 89. "Caesar: A Lonely Youth" (シーザー孤独の青春, Shīzā Kodoku no Seishun); 90. "Horrifying! The Ghostly Man" (鬼気!幻の男, Kiki! Maboroshi no Otoko); 91. "The Fight Between Light and Wind!!" (光と風の激突!!, Hikari to Kaze no Gekitotsu!!); 92. "The Crimson Bubble" (鮮赤のシャボン, Senseki no Shabon); 93. "Caesar's Final Hamon" (シーザー最期の波紋, Shīzā Saigo no Hamon); 94. "Silk Dancing Lisa Lisa" (絹の舞いリサリサ, Shiruku no Mai Risa Risa); 95. "The Hundred vs. Two Strategy" (100対2のかけ引き, Hyaku Tai Ni no Kakehiki)
11	The Warrior Returns to the Wind; Kaze ni Kaeru Senshi (風にかえる戦士)	August 10, 1989	978-4-08-851067-5
96. "The Skeleton Heel Stone" (骸骨の踵石, Gaikotsu no Kakato Ishi); 97. "Furious Struggle from Ancient Times" (荒ぶる古の戦, Araburu Inishie no Ikusa); 98. "Moonlight Start!" (月光のスタート!, Gekkō no Sutāto); 99. "The Pillar and the Hammer!" (柱とハンマー!, Hashira to Hanmā); 100. "Genius Trickster" (天才的イカサマ師, Tensaiteki Ikasama-shi); 101. "A True Warrior" (真の格闘者, Shin no Kakutōsha); 102. "Shoot Beyond the Target!" (対称点上を撃て!, Taishō Tenjō o Ute!); 103. "The Final Mode of the Wind" (風の最終流法(ファイナルモード), Kaze no Fainaru Mōdo); 104. "The Warrior Returns to the Wind" (風にかえる戦士, Kaze ni Kaeru Senshi)
12	The Birth of a Superbeing!! Chō Seibutsu no Tanjō!! (超生物の誕生!!)	October 9, 1989	978-4-08-851068-2
105. "Treachery! The Sacrificial Temple" (悪逆!生贄の神殿, Akugyaku! Ikenie no Shinden); 106. "The Bond That Binds Lisa Lisa and JoJo" (リサリサ、JOJOを結ぶ絆, Risa Risa, Jojo o Musubu Kizuna); 107. "JoJo: The Final Hamon" (JOJO 最期の波紋, Jojo Saigo no Hamon); 108. "The Tragedy of George Joestar" (ジョージ・ジョースターの悲劇, Jōji Jōsutā no Higeki); 109. "The Birth of a Superbeing!!" (超生物の誕生!!, Chō Seibutsu no Tanjō!!); 110. "JoJo's Final Gamble!" (JOJO 最後の賭け!, JoJo Saigo no Kake!); 111. "The Man Who Became a God!!" (神となった男!!, Kami to Natta Otoko!!); 112. "The Phenomenal Power of the Red Stone" (驚異の赤石パワー, Kyōi no Sekiseki Pawā); 113. "The Man Who Came Back" (帰ってきた男, Kaettekita Otoko); 114. "A Man Possessed" (悪霊にとりつかれた男, Akuryō ni Toritsukareta Otoko; lit. 'A Man Possessed by an Evil Spirit') (Note: Chapter 114 is part of Stardust Crusaders, and is omitted from this volume in some versions outside Japan.)

=== 2002 release (Shueisha Bunko) ===
No.	Title	Japanese release date	Japanese ISBN
1 (4)	Part 2: Battle Tendency 1 Part 2 Sentō Chōryū 1 (Part2 戦闘潮流 1)	April 18, 2002	4-08-617787-0
45–47. "Joseph Joestar of New York (1–3)" (ニューヨークのジョセフ・ジョースター その①〜③, Nyū Yōku no Josefu Jōsutā Sono 1–3); 48–52. "Straizo vs. Joseph (1–5)" (ストレイツォVSジョセフ その①〜⑤, Sutoreitso Bāsasu Josefu Sono 1–5); 53. "The Pillar Man" (「柱の男」, "Hashira no Otoko"); 54–62. "The Pillar Man, Santana (1–9)" (「柱の男・サンタナ」 その①〜⑨, "Hashira no Otoko: Santana" Sono 1–9)
2 (5)	Part 2: Battle Tendency 2 Part 2 Sentō Chōryū 2 (Part2 戦闘潮流 2)	April 18, 2002	4-08-617788-9
63. "Joseph Joestar of Rome" (ローマのジョセフ・ジョースター, Rōma no Josefu Jōsutā); 64. "The Red Stone of Aja" (エイジャの赤石, Eija no Sekiseki); 65–69. "Ultimate Warriors from Ancient Times (1–5)" (太古から来た究極戦士 その①〜⑤, Taiko kara Kita Kyūkyoku Senshi Sono 1–5); 70. "An Engagement with Death: The Wedding Ring" (死の契約・結婚指輪, Shi no Keiyaku: Uedingu Ringu); 71–76. "Hamon Teacher Lisa Lisa (1–6)" (波紋教師 リサリサ その①〜⑥, Hamon Kyōshi Risa Risa Sono 1–6); 77. "Go! Hamon Master" (行け!波紋マスター, Ike! Hamon Masutā); 78–79. "Flame Mode Esidisi (1–2)" (炎・流法(モード) エシディシ その①〜②, Honō Mōdo Eshidishi Sono 1–2)
3 (6)	Part 2: Battle Tendency 3 Part 2 Sentō Chōryū 3 (Part2 戦闘潮流 3)	May 17, 2002	4-08-617789-7
80. "Flame Mode Esidisi (3)" (炎・流法(モード) エシディシ その③, Honō Mōdo Eshidishi Sono 3); 81–82. "The Remains Lurk (1–2)" (忍びよる残骸 その①〜②, Shinobiyoru Zangai Sono 1–2); 83–85. "Stroheim's Unit Strikes Back (1–3)" (シュトロハイム隊の逆襲 その①〜③, Shutorohaimu-tai no Gyakushū Sono 1–3); 86–87. "Light Mode Kars (1–2)" (光・流法(モード) カーズ その①〜②, Hikari Mōdo Kāzu Sono 1–2); 88–93. "Caesar: A Lonely Youth (1–6)" (シーザー孤独の青春 その①〜⑥, Shīzā Kodoku no Seishun Sono 1–6); 94. "Climb Out of the Fortified Hotel" (要塞ホテルを登り切れ, Yōsai Hoteru o Noborikire); 95–96. "The Wind, the Chariot, and Wamuu (1–2)" (風と戦車とワムウ その①〜②, Kaze to Sensha to Wamū Sono 1–2)
4 (7)	Part 2: Battle Tendency 4 Part 2 Sentō Chōryū 4 (Part2 戦闘潮流 4)	May 17, 2002	4-08-617790-0
97–103. "The Wind, the Chariot, and Wamuu (3–9)" (風と戦車とワムウ その③〜⑨, Kaze to Sensha to Wamū Sono 3–9); 104. "The Warrior Returns to the Wind" (風にかえる戦士, Kaze ni Kaeru Senshi); 105–106. "The Bond That Binds Lisa Lisa and JoJo (1–2)" (リサリサとジョジョを結ぶ絆 その①〜②, Risa Risa to JoJo o Musubu Kizuna Sono 1–2); 107–108. "JoJo: The Final Hamon (1–2)" (ジョジョ 最後の波紋 その①〜②, JoJo Saigo no Hamon Sono 1–2); 109–110. "Kars the Superbeing Is Born (1–2)" (超生物カーズ誕生 その①〜②, Chō Seibutsu Kāzu Tanjō Sono 1–2); 111. "Joseph's Final Gamble" (ジョセフ最後の賭け, Josefu Saigo no Kake); 112. "The Man Who Became a God" (神となった男, Kami to Natta Otoko); 113. "The Man Who Crossed the Atlantic" (大西洋を越えて来た男, Taiseiyō o Koetekita Otoko)

=== 2012 release (Shueisha Manga Soshuhen) ===
No.	Title	Japanese release date	Japanese ISBN
1 (2)	Part 2: Battle Tendency Digest Edition Top; Dai Ni Bu Sentō Chōryū Sōshūhen Ue (第2部 戦闘潮流 総集編・上)	December 7, 2012	978-4-08-111058-2
2 (3)	Part 2: Battle Tendency Digest Edition Bottom; Dai Ni Bu Sentō Chōryū Sōshūhen Shita (第2部 戦闘潮流 総集編・下)	January 5, 2013	978-4-08-111059-9

=== 2014 release (JoJonium) / English release ===
No.	Title	Original release date	English release date
1 (4)	Part 2: Battle Tendency 01; JoJonium 4	February 4, 2014; 978-4-08-782835-1	April 21, 2015 (digital); November 3, 2015 (physical); 978-1-4215-7882-8
Chapters 1–18 (Note: In the Viz Media release, chapters 10–18 (chapters 54–62 in earlier releases) are known as "The Pillar Man, Santviento".)
2 (5)	Part 2: Battle Tendency 02; JoJonium 5	March 4, 2014; 978-4-08-782836-8	August 18, 2015 (digital); February 2, 2016 (physical); 978-1-4215-7883-5
Chapters 19–36
3 (6)	Part 2: Battle Tendency 03; JoJonium 6	April 4, 2014; 978-4-08-782837-5	November 17, 2015 (digital); May 3, 2016 (physical); 978-1-4215-7884-2
Chapters 37–49
4 (7)	Part 2: Battle Tendency 04; JoJonium 7	May 2, 2014; 978-4-08-782838-2	March 15, 2016 (digital); August 2, 2016 (physical); 978-1-4215-7885-9
Chapters 50–69

== Related media ==
Ōtarō Maijō's 2012 novel Jorge Joestar, follows the titular character, the father of Joseph Joestar, and his story as a child in the Canary Islands and pilot in the Royal Air Force, as well as an alternate version who lives in Japan and is investigating strange events regarding alternate dimensions.

The arc was adapted as part of the first season of David Production's anime television adaptation, airing between December 7, 2012, and April 5, 2013. Warner Bros. Entertainment released this series in English on July 28, 2015.

The young Joseph of this series appears as a playable character, alongside his older self, in Capcom's 1998 arcade fighting game, JoJo's Bizarre Adventure. Joseph, Caesar, Wamuu, Esidisi and Kars appear as playable characters in Bandai Namco Games' 2013 fighting game, JoJo's Bizarre Adventure: All-Star Battle, with Lisa Lisa later appearing as a downloadable character. Joseph, Caesar, Stroheim, Lisa Lisa, Wamuu, Esidisi, and Kars also appear in JoJo's Bizarre Adventure: Eyes of Heaven, also by Bandai Namco.

== Reception ==
Anime News Network's Rebecca Silverman described Battle Tendency as "less urgent" than Part 1, which allows for more humor and insanity, while still letting the reader get attached to the characters. She felt positively about how strikingly different the protagonist Joseph is from Part 1's Jonathan. However, she wrote that Araki's art had gotten even more "physically improbable," making it difficult to distinguish body parts. When discussing his views on having characters die in a series, writer Gen Urobuchi cited Battle Tendency's Caesar Zeppeli as a character who became "immortal" thanks to his death.
