= Phantom Blood =

First story arc of JoJo's Bizarre Adventure

- Cover of Weekly Shōnen Jump #1–2 of 1987, depicting (left to right) Dio Brando, Jonathan Joestar and his dog Danny

ファントムブラッド (Fantomu Buraddo)
- Genre: Adventure, supernatural
- Manga
- Written by: Hirohiko Araki
- Published by: Shueisha
- English publisher: NA: Viz Media
- Imprint: Jump Comics
- Magazine: Weekly Shōnen Jump
- Original run: January 1, 1987 – October 26, 1987
- Volumes: 5
- Anime film
- Directed by: Jūnichi Hayama
- Written by: Mitsuhiro Yamada
- Music by: Marco d' Ambrosio
- Studio: A.P.P.P.
- Released: February 17, 2007
- Runtime: 90 minutes
- Other media
- Animated TV series (2012)
- Chronology
- Followed by: Battle Tendency
- icon

Phantom Blood (Japanese: ファントムブラッド, Hepburn: Fantomu Buraddo) is a Japanese manga series created by Hirohiko Araki, and the first main story arc of the larger JoJo's Bizarre Adventure series. The manga was originally serialized by Shueisha in Weekly Shōnen Jump under the title JoJo's Bizarre Adventure Part 1 Jonathan Joestar: His Youth (ジョジョの奇妙な冒険 第一部 ジョナサン·ジョースター ―その青春―, JoJo no Kimyō na Bōken Dai Ichi Bu Jonasan Jōsutā -Sono Seishun) and was collected in five volumes; a three-volume collection was released by Shueisha in Japan in 2002, and by Viz Media in North America in 2014. The arc was serialized for more than 10 months; from January 1 to October 26, 1987. It was followed by Battle Tendency.

The story is set in England in the middle-to-late 1880s, (Note: Dario Brando dies in 1880, while Jonathan Joestar defeats Dio Brando on February 7, 1889.) (Note: The first part of the prologue is set in Mexico circa the 12th–16th century.) and follows Jonathan Joestar, the heir of the wealthy Joestar family, and his adoptive brother Dio Brando, who wishes to take the Joestar fortune for himself. Using an ancient stone mask, Dio transforms himself into a vampire, and Jonathan learns the sunlight-based martial arts technique of Hamon (Note: Hamon (波紋; lit. "Ripple")) to fight him. Araki described the themes of the story as "being alive" and "an affirmation that humanity is wonderful", with characters growing and overcoming problems through their own actions.

The series received reviews ranging from mixed to positive, with critics frequently criticizing the anatomy and character posing in Araki's artwork, and Araki was often told during the serialization that Phantom Blood was the one series that did not fit in with the "best of the best" that were published at the same time, like Dragon Ball and Fist of the North Star. The series has seen two anime adaptations, in the form of a 2007 film by A.P.P.P., and as part of the first season of David Production's 2012 JoJo's Bizarre Adventure TV series. It was also adapted into a 2006 video game by Bandai. A stage musical adaptation debuted in February 2024.

== Plot ==
In 19th-century England, a youth born into poverty named Dio Brando is adopted by the wealthy George Joestar to repay a family debt to Dio's father Dario, who died in 1880. George's son Jonathan, who aspires to become a gentleman, becomes his adoptive brother. However, Dio wants to take the Joestar fortune for himself, and manipulates Jonathan's close ones into shunning him. After forcibly stealing the first kiss of Jonathan's girlfriend Erina Pendleton, an enraged Jonathan overpowers Dio in a fistfight. Dio gets revenge by trapping Jonathan's pet dog Danny in an incinerator, killing him. Jonathan and Dio develop an interest in a mysterious stone mask that reacted to Dio's blood being spilt in the battle. Jonathan learns that the mask was used by the Aztecs to bring the wearer immortality.

In 1888, after becoming old enough to inherit the Joestar fortune, Dio deliberately poisons Jonathan's father, George. Jonathan learns of Dio's plot and his search for evidence takes him to Ogre Street, a dangerous street in London, where he befriends a thug named Robert E. O. Speedwagon. At the same time, Dio intends to arrange a freak accident to kill Jonathan with the stone mask and tests the mask on a drunkard. The mask instead turns the drunkard into a powerful vampire who nearly kills Dio before being destroyed by sunlight. Jonathan and Speedwagon return to the mansion with evidence and expose Dio's scheme. Dio attempts to kill Jonathan with a knife but George sacrifices his life to save Jonathan. Dio uses the blood spilt by George and the mask to become a vampire. Jonathan sets the Joestar family's mansion on fire and impales Dio on a statue in the burning mansion, but Dio survives.

While recovering from his wounds, Jonathan reunites with Erina. The couple later meets Will A. Zeppeli, a man who intends to destroy the stone mask after it caused his father's death. Zeppeli teaches Jonathan how to use a supernatural energy produced by controlled breathing called Hamon. Then, on November 30, 1888, Jonathan, Speedwagon, and Zeppeli travel to Wind Knights Lot, where Dio is creating an army of zombies. Zeppeli is mortally wounded by one of these zombies, Tarkus, and passes the last of his Hamon energy on to Jonathan before dying. Joined by Zeppeli's fellow Hamon users, on December 1, 1888, Jonathan destroys Dio's body by sending Hamon directly through him. Dio decapitates his head to survive the Hamon attack. Speedwagon destroys the stone mask. On February 2, 1889, Jonathan marries Erina. The next day, they leave on a ship to the United States on their honeymoon. Dio sneaks aboard the ship, intending to transplant his head onto Jonathan's body.

On February 7, 1889, Dio mortally wounds Jonathan. Jonathan uses the last of his Hamon to manipulate the body of Dio's servant Wang Chan into obstructing the ship's paddle wheel, setting it to explode. Jonathan dies with Dio's head in his arms while Erina escapes in the coffin that Dio hid in with a dead passenger's baby girl. Rescued near the Canary Islands two days later, Erina vows to pass on the truth of Jonathan's life to her unborn child and the generations to follow.

== Production ==
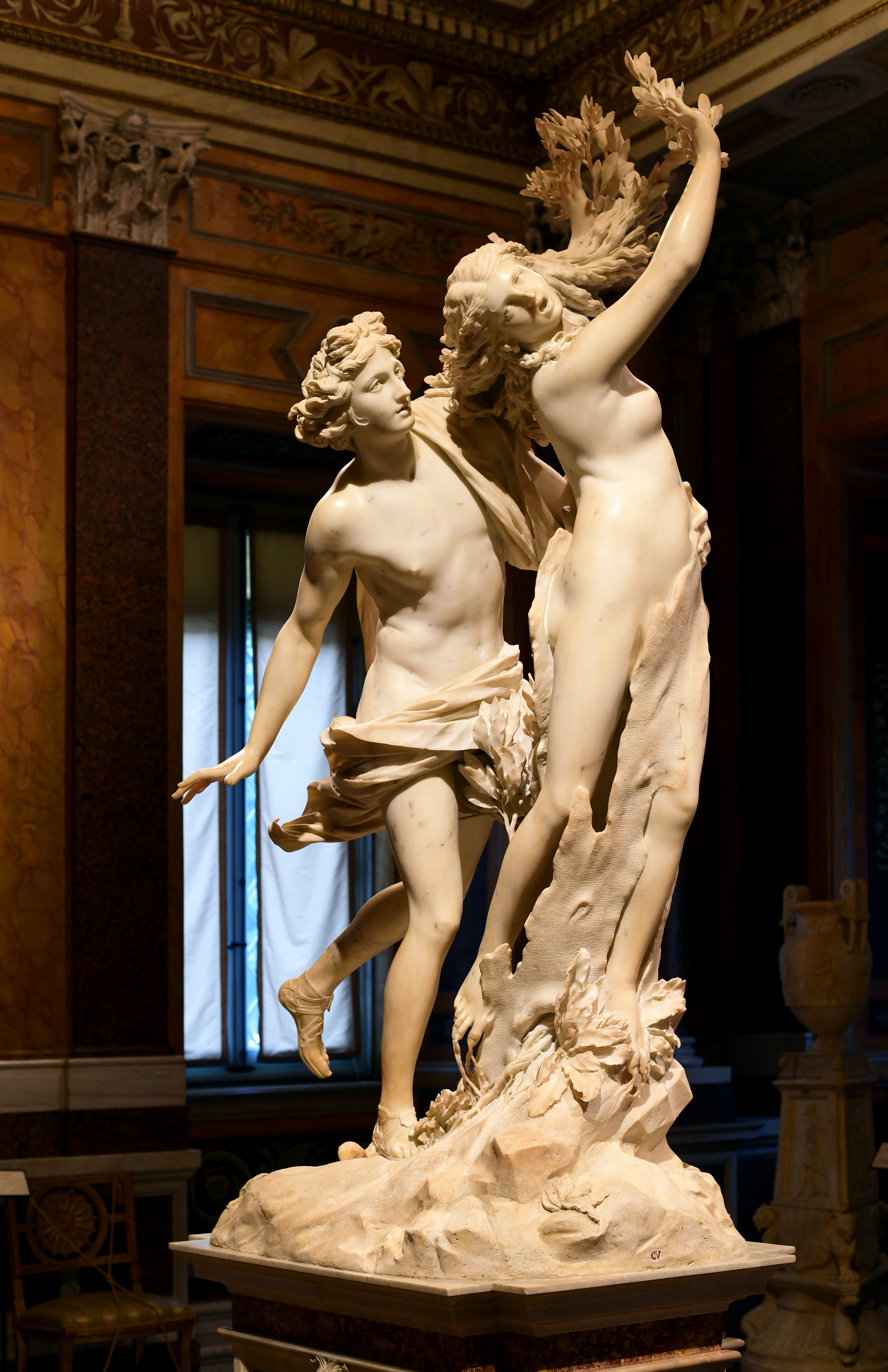
The character posing was influenced by Bernini's sculpture Apollo and Daphne.

Phantom Blood was written and drawn by Hirohiko Araki. Prior to working on the series, he created a manga that resembled the works of Hisashi Eguchi, an artist known for his art of female characters; Araki's editor, Ryōsuke Kabashima, angrily told Araki to never draw something as derivative again, which led him to take another direction with his art, and the creation of Phantom Blood. Due to the popularity of Arnold Schwarzenegger and Sylvester Stallone at the time, Araki designed characters with muscular body types. The character posing, which Araki considers a distinctive aspect of his art, was influenced by a trip to Italy just before the serialization of Phantom Blood, where he went to the Galleria Borghese in Rome and saw Gian Lorenzo Bernini's sculpture Apollo and Daphne. Seeing it in person from different angles had a large influence on him; he described it as overwhelmingly beautiful and intense, and unlike sculptures in Japanese museums and the figure posing of most manga artists.

=== Structure and themes ===
Phantom Blood was created using a ki-shō-ten-ketsu structure – introduction (ki), development (shō), twist (ten), and resolution (ketsu) – along with the rule of rising and falling, in which the hero must grow over time in relation to their starting point in the beginning of the story, and not stagnate or regress. Araki did however note that due to the weekly format of the series, Jonathan's initial regression when Dio turns Jonathan's happy life into hardships meant that Jonathan's growth remained in the negative for a few weeks after the series' premiere, leading to a negative feeling that Jonathan always loses. Araki implemented a similar growth curve for Dio, although with him rising towards evil. Despite following the rule of the ever-progressing hero, Araki decided to bend the rule and have Jonathan die to save his wife and child: he acknowledged that dying is as far negative as a hero can go, and called it unthinkable to do such a thing in a shōnen manga, but said that since he wanted to pass down the Joestar family's lineage, he needed Jonathan to die, and for his blood and spirit to be passed to the protagonist of the second part of the series. While calling it a gamble, he called this passing of the torch a positive that enables the extreme negative of killing the first protagonist.

The themes of Phantom Blood were described by Araki as "being alive" and "an affirmation that humanity is wonderful". He explained the latter as a description for humanity's ability to grow and overcome hardships through one's strength and spirit; this is a recurring theme that has been used in all following parts of JoJo's Bizarre Adventure, portrayed through people succeeding in fights through their own actions, without relying on machines or gods. This theme, along with the passing of the torch, was influenced by Araki's grandfather's death near the start of the serialization, and his thoughts about how people leave parts of themselves behind for the next generation when they die.

Wanting readers to know that the stone mask and its powers would be what would drive the plot, Araki started the manga with a prologue involving the mask, focusing on communicating the mood, rather than the standard way of opening a manga with an introduction of the protagonist. The concept of Hamon was created as he thought about how to create drawings that show the invisible; he came up with the idea of a character punching a frog, which was left unharmed, while the rock underneath cracked open, thus showing the supernatural power of the character's abilities. It was also influenced by his love for karate manga, with the supernatural moves used within them.

=== Creation of characters ===
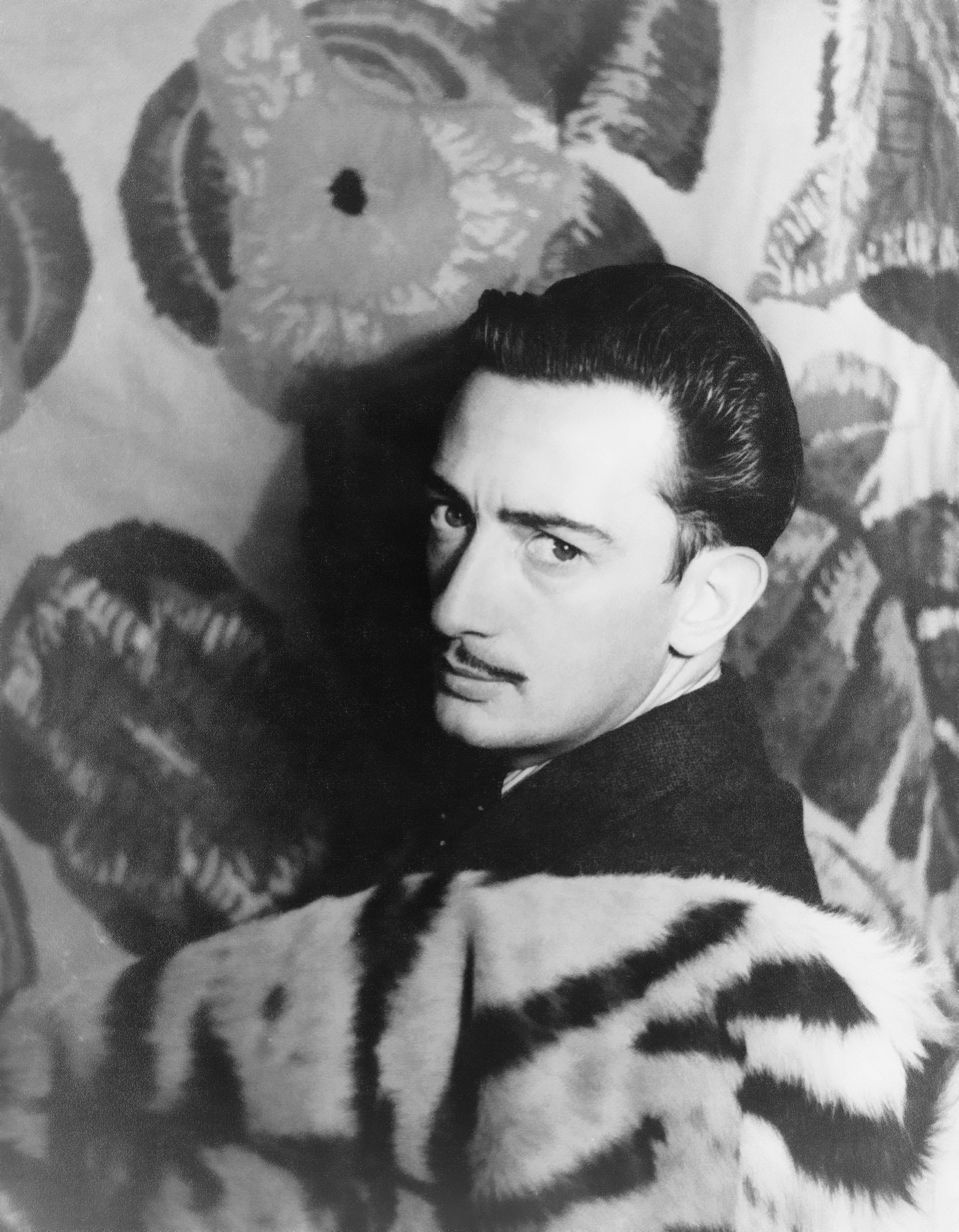
Salvador Dalí influenced the design of Zeppeli.

As part of the creation of each character, Araki wrote down a fictional history for the character, to prevent inconsistencies; while not all information he writes in these is used directly in the manga, it helps him determine how the character should act and react in different situations. Jonathan and Dio, the protagonist and antagonist, were created with the duality of light and shadow in mind, with the intention to have them contrast against each other: Dio was depicted as an embodiment of evil, and Jonathan as "fundamentally virtuous" and just. Araki also made use of black and white in his art to further contrast the two. Jonathan was designed to be a symbol for the story and setting, something Araki would continue doing with later protagonists in the series. Because Araki wanted the series to move on with new characters in the Joestar family, Jonathan was specifically written as "the first Joestar" that would function as a symbol of purity and dignity, and not as a unique character. This limited what Jonathan could do; in retrospect, Araki considered him passive and "a bit boring".

From the start of the planning of the manga, Araki intended to depict Dio as a "cool" character who descends into villainy. Thinking that it could be difficult to create an evil antagonist that readers would empathize with, Araki wrote Dio as coming from a poor family with a father "with no redeeming qualities whatsoever", giving Dio motivation to acquire power and get revenge on the world even if it led him to do immoral and illegal things. Araki also noted that a character who acts without regard for morals and laws can give readers a feeling of catharsis due to exhibiting the same "ugly feelings" people hold but cannot show, making Dio more easily relatable than a character who only does good. Dio's name was taken directly from the Italian word for "god", and was chosen to sound good together with the name "JoJo".

The main supporting character of Phantom Blood, Zeppeli, was created as a "silly teacher" in the style of the martial art masters from Jackie Chan's films and The Karate Kid, with a charm in the contrast between how they appear and who they are inside. Araki designed him with a mustache, drawing inspiration from the appearances of the painter Salvador Dalí and the Osomatsu-kun character Iyami; this was considered a gamble, as mustachioed characters in shōnen magazines were considered to appear old and untrustworthy, potentially turning readers off. His name comes from the rock band Led Zeppelin, and was chosen to balance out the large amount of names in the series beginning with "J"; the character Speedwagon was given his name (which comes from the rock band REO Speedwagon) for the same reason.

== Release and related media ==
Phantom Blood was originally serialized in Shueisha's Weekly Shōnen Jump under the title JoJo's Bizarre Adventure Part 1 Jonathan Joestar: His Youth. It ran from January 1 to October 26, 1987, for a total of 44 chapters, and was later collected in five tankōbon volumes. It was also collected in a three-volume bunkoban collection on February 15, 2002, and a single volume sōshūhen edition in 2012. Another three-volume collection with new cover art by Araki was released from December 4, 2013, to January 4, 2014, as part of the JoJonium line, along with the second and third part of the series, Battle Tendency and Stardust Crusaders. This version was released in North America by Viz Media, beginning digitally in 2014 and in print in 2015. A digitally colored version of the complete manga was released digitally for smartphones and tablet computers in Japan on July 13, 2012.

To celebrate the series' anniversary, a video game adaptation was released in 2006 by Bandai for the PlayStation 2, and a Phantom Blood anime film adaptation, JoJo's Bizarre Adventure: Phantom Blood, was produced by A.P.P.P. and released in Japanese theaters in 2007. The film has never been released on home video. The owarai duo Speedwagon (Jun Itoda and Kazuhiro Ozawa), who took their name from the Phantom Blood character, make cameo appearances in the film as Dario Brando and Wang Chen. Phantom Blood was again adapted into anime in 2012, as part of the first season of David Production's JoJo's Bizarre Adventure TV anime series.

In 2023, a stage musical adaptation produced by Toho was announced, directed by Ney Hasegawa with the script written by Tsuneyasu Motoyoshi. The musical debuted in February 2024 with Yuya Matsushita and Shotaro Arisawa starring as Jonathan Joestar alongside Mamoru Miyano as Dio Brando.

== Volumes ==
=== Original volumization (Jump Comics) ===
No.	Title	Japanese release date	Japanese ISBN
1	Dio the Invader; Shinryakusha Dio (侵略者ディオ)	August 10, 1987	978-4-08-851126-9
1. "Dio the Invader" (侵略者ディオ, Shinryakusha Dio); 2. "A New Friend!" (新しき友人!, Atarashiki Yūjin!); 3. "Beloved Erina" (愛しのエリナ, Itoshi no Erina); 4. "A Fight I Cannot Lose" (負けられない戦い, Makerarenai Tatakai); 5. "Danny in Flames" (炎のダニー, Honō no Danī); 6. "A Letter from the Past" (過去からの手紙, Kako kara no Tegami); 7. "A Vow to Father" (父への誓い, Chichi e no Chikai); 8. "The Battle on Ogre Street" (食屍鬼街(オウガーストリート)の戦い, Ougā Sutorīto no Tatakai)
2	The Thirst for Blood! Chi no Kawaki! (血の渇き!)	January 8, 1988	978-4-08-851127-6
9. "The Live Subject Test of the Mask" (仮面の人体実験, Kamen no Jintai Jikken); 10. "The Thirst For Blood!" (血の渇き!, Chi no Kawaki!); 11. "Transcend Humanity!" (人間を超越する!, Ningen o Chōetsu Suru!); 12. "The Two Rings" (一組(ふたつ)の指輪(リング), Futatsu no Ringu); 13. "Immortal Monster" (不死の怪物, Fushi no Kaibutsu); 14. "Attack of the Living Dead" (生ける死者(リビング・デッド)の襲撃, Ribingu Deddo no Shūgeki); 15. "Settling the Youth with Dio!" (ディオとの青春に決着!, Dio to no Seishun ni Ketchaku!); 16. "Statue of the Goddess of Love" (慈愛の女神像, Jiai no Megamizō); 17. "Nostalgic Face" (懐しき面影, Natsukashiki Omokage)
3	The Dark Knights; Ankoku no Kishi-tachi (暗黒の騎士達)	April 8, 1988	978-4-08-851128-3
18. "Jack the Ripper and Zeppeli the Eccentric" (凶人ジャック&(と)奇人ツェペリ, Kyōjin Jakku to Kijin Tseperi); 19. "The Miracle Energy" (奇跡のエネルギー, Kiseki no Enerugī); 20. "The Tragedy at Sea" (洋上の惨劇, Yōjō no Sangeki); 21. "Salem's Lot" (呪われた町, Norowareta Machi); 22. "Make Fear Yours" (恐怖を我が物とせよ, Kyōfu o Wagamono to Seyo); 23. "Northern Wind and Vikings" (北風とバイキング, Kitakaze to Baikingu); 24. "Invitation to a Trap" (罠への招待, Wana e no Shōtai); 25. "The Mask's Blood-Chilling Power" (血も凍る仮面力(パワー), Chi mo Kōru Kamen Pawā); 26. "The Dark Knights" (暗黒の騎士達, Ankoku no Kishi-tachi); 27. "Vengeful Demons from the Past" (過去からの復讐鬼, Kako kara no Fukushūki)
4	To the Chamber of the Two-Headed Dragon; Sōshuryū no Ma e (双首竜の間へ)	June 10, 1988	978-4-08-851129-0
28. "The Hero of the 77 Rings" (77輝輪(リング)の勇者, Nana Jū Nana Ringu no Yūsha); 29. "Curse of the Dark Knight" (黒騎士の呪縛, Kurokishi no Jubaku); 30. "Sleep as a Hero" (英雄として瞑る, Eiyū Toshite Nemuru); 31. "The Knights' Ruins" (騎士たちの遺跡, Kishi-tachi no Iseki); 32. "To the Chamber of the Two-Headed Dragon" (双首竜の間へ, Sōshuryū no Ma e); 33. "Pluck for Tomorrow" (あしたの勇気, Ashita no Yūki); 34. "The Master's Prophecy" (老師の予言, Rōshi no Yogen); 35. "Blast Him With Rage!" (怒りをたたきこめ!, Ikari o Tatakikome!); 36. "The Three from a Faraway Land" (遙かな国からの3人, Haruka na Kuni kara no Sannin); 37. "Doobie the Phantom" (怪人ドゥービー, Kaijin Dūbī)
5	The Final Hamon! Saigo no Hamon! (最後の波紋!)	August 10, 1988	978-4-08-851130-6
38. "Thunder Cross Split Attack" (稲妻十字空烈刃(サンダークロススプリットアタック), Sandā Kurosu Supuritto Atakku); 39. "Bloody Battle! JoJo & Dio" (血戦！JoJo(ジョジョ)&(と)Dio(ディオ), Kessen! JoJo to Dio); 40. "Fire and Ice!" (炎(ファイヤー)&(アンド)氷(アイス)！, Faiyā Ando Aisu!); 41. "A Demon's End!" (悪鬼の最期!, Akki no Saigo!); 42. "Overture to the Dreadful Storm" (恐嵐への序曲, Kyōran e no Jokyoku); 43. "The Final Hamon!" (最後の波紋!, Saigo no Hamon!); 44. "Into Oblivion" (忘却の彼方へ, Bōkyaku no Kanata e); 45. "JoJo of New York" (ニューヨークのジョジョ, Nyū Yōku no JoJo) (Note: Chapters 45–47 are part of Battle Tendency and are omitted from this volume in some versions outside Japan.); 46. "The Living Statue" (生きた彫像, Ikita Chōzō); 47. "Painful News" (悲痛なしらせ, Hitsū na Shirase)

=== 2002 release (Shueisha Bunko) ===
No.	Title	Japanese release date	Japanese ISBN
1	Part 1: Phantom Blood 1 Part 1 Fantomu Buraddo 1 (Part1 ファントムブラッド1)	February 15, 2002	4-08-617784-6
1. "Prologue" (プロローグ, Purorōgu); 2–5. "Dio Brando the Invader (1–4)" (侵略者ディオ・ブランドー その①〜④, Shinryakusha Dio Burandō Sono 1–4); 6–7. "A Letter from the Past (1–2)" (過去からの手紙 その①〜②, Kako kara no Tegami Sono 1–2); 8–11. "The Stone Mask (1–4)" (石仮面 その①〜④, Ishi Kamen Sono 1–4); 12–14. "Youth with Dio (1–3)" (ディオとの青春 その①〜③, Dio to no Seishun Sono 1–3)
2	Part 1: Phantom Blood 2 Part 1 Fantomu Buraddo 2 (Part1 ファントムブラッド2)	February 15, 2002	4-08-617785-4
15–16. "Youth with Dio (4–5)" (ディオとの青春 その④〜⑤, Dio to no Seishun Sono 4–5); 17. "The Birth of Dio" (DIO(ディオ)の誕生, Dio no Tanjō); 18–22. "Jack the Ripper and Zeppeli the Eccentric (1–5)" (切り裂きジャックと奇人ツェペリ その①〜⑤, Kirisaki Jakku to Kijin Tseperi Sono 1–5); 23–25. "Hamon Overdrive (1–3)" (波紋疾走(ハモン・オーバードライブ)その①〜③, Hamon Ōbādoraibu Sono 1–3); 26–29. "Tarkus and the Dark Knight Bruford (1–4)" (タルカスと黒騎士ブラフォード その①〜④, Tarukasu to Kurokishi Burafōdo Sono 1–4)
3	Part 1: Phantom Blood 3 Part 1 Fantomu Buraddo 3 (Part1 ファントムブラッド3)	February 15, 2002	4-08-617786-2
30. "Sleep as a Hero" (英雄として眠る, Eiyū toshite Nemuru); 31. "The Knights' Ruins" (騎士たちの遺跡, Kishitachi no Iseki); 32. "The Medieval Knights' Training Ground for Murder" (中世騎士殺人修練場, Chūsei Kishi Satsujin Shūren Jō); 33–35. "Pluck for Tomorrow and the Successor (1–3)" (あしたの勇気・うけ継ぐ者 その①〜③, Ashita no Yūki Uketsugumono Sono 1–3); 36–38. "The Three from a Faraway Land (1–3)" (遥かな国からの3人 その①〜③, Harukana Kuni kara no 3nin Sono 1–3); 39–44. "Fire and Ice, Jonathan and Dio (1–6)" (炎(ファイヤー)と氷(アイス) ジョナサンとディオ その①〜⑥, Faiyā to Aisu Jonasan to Dio Sono 1–6)

=== 2012 release (Shueisha Manga Soshuhen) ===
No.	Title	Japanese release date	Japanese ISBN
1	Part 1: Phantom Blood Digest Edition; Dai Ichi Bu Fantomu Buraddo Sōshūhen (第1部 ファントムブラッド 総集編)	October 5, 2012	978-4-08-111057-5
Chapters 1–44

=== 2013 release (JoJonium) / English release ===
No.	Title	Original release date	English release date
1	Part 1: Phantom Blood 01; JoJonium 1	December 4, 2013; 978-4-08-782832-0	September 2, 2014 (digital); February 24, 2015 (physical); 978-1-4215-7879-8
Chapters 1–11
2	Part 1: Phantom Blood 02; JoJonium 2	December 4, 2013; 978-4-08-782833-7	November 4, 2014 (digital); May 5, 2015 (physical); 978-1-4215-7880-4
Chapters 12–27 (Note: In the Viz Media release, chapters 26 and 27 are known as "Tarkus and the Dark Knight Blueford".)
3	Part 1: Phantom Blood 03; JoJonium 3	January 4, 2014; 978-4-08-782834-4	February 3, 2015 (digital); August 4, 2015 (physical); 978-1-4215-7881-1
Chapters 28–44 (Note: In the Viz Media release, chapters 28 and 29 are known as "Tarukus and the Dark Knight Blueford".)

== Reception ==
Phantom Blood was met with reviews ranging from critical to positive. According to Araki, he was often told during the original serialization of the manga that it was the one series that did not fit in with the "best of the best" that were serialized at the same time, such as Dragon Ball, Fist of the North Star, Captain Tsubasa, Kinnikuman and Saint Seiya. Weekly Shōnen Jump readers were critical of the first few chapters, finding Jonathan unlikable as he kept losing against Dio at that point. The series was included in Anime News Network's list of the best and most memorable manga of 2015, as the winner in the "WTF Did I Just Read?!" category.

Joseph Luster at Otaku USA called Phantom Blood "a treat" for both new and old readers of the JoJo's Bizarre Adventure series, but thought that it feels slow-paced compared to Stardust Crusaders. Ziah Grace and Clair Napier of ComicsAlliance were very critical of the series, calling it "meaningless junk" that should not have been republished in 2015, and recommended readers to read a plot summary of Phantom Blood and start with Battle Tendency instead. They criticized the series' depiction of animal cruelty, and the "bad or non-existent" female roles in the story. Anime News Network's Rebecca Silverman appreciated the realism in how Dio appears perfectly mannered to George while also being sadistically cruel, and how the series uses a mix between Aztec mythology and vampire lore, but thought that the story could be too cruel for some readers, citing the animal cruelty as an example. She liked how the story escalates in intensity and weirdness, but criticized it for telling more often than showing, and using exclamation marks too much.

Several reviewers criticized the artwork in Phantom Blood for the characters' anatomy and posing; Silverman described it as featuring impossible poses and characters appearing to have disproportionally small heads atop large, muscled bodies. She additionally criticized the art for being crowded and hard to read. ComicsAlliance disliked how the art felt derivative of Fist of the North Star. Takato at Manga-News thought that the anatomy and posing, while fitting the tone of the story, were unlikely and badly drawn. Luster thought that the art was not nearly as good as Araki's later works, but that it was charming and worked despite the "twisted proportions" due to its high intensity and stylization. Kory Cerjak at The Fandom Post enjoyed the artwork, however, calling it "straight out of the 80s", giving the series a similar feeling to watching a good action film from that time period.

The box set for the three-volume JoJonium release of the series was the 47th best selling comic in Japan during its debut week according to Oricon, selling an estimated 19,374 copies. The three English volumes all charted on The New York Times Manga Best Seller list for three weeks in a row; volume 1 premiered in first place, and both volume 2 and 3 debuted in second place, after The Legend of Zelda: A Link to the Past and Naruto volume 71, respectively.
