= No Regret Life =

Japanese band

- Origin: Kanoya, Japan
- Genres: Rock
- Years active: 2001–2013
- Labels: Yeah! Yeah! Yeah! Records spiral-motion Roadrunner Records
- Past members: Kazusō Oda; Ryūta Hashiguchi; Genta Matsumura; Yuka Shimokariya
- Website: http://www.noregretlife.com/

No Regret Life was a Japanese rock band formed in 2001. The band disbanded in July 2013.

== History ==
No Regret Life was founded in January 2001 in Kanoya, Kagoshima, Japan, by Kazusō Oda, Ryūta Hashiguchi, and Yuka Shimokariya, who was later replaced by Genta Matsumura. They played live shows before releasing their first album Tomorrow is the Another Day in November 2002. In May 2003, they toured with Ellegarden. In April 2004, they released a mini album My Life, My Song, My Mind.

In February 2005, they signed with Yeah! Yeah! Yeah! Records and released their first maxi-single on February 9, 2005 entitled "メロディー (Melody)". This was followed by their next two singles "失くした言葉 (Nakushita Kotoba)" on June 8, which was used as the 9th ending theme for the popular anime Naruto, and "あの日の未来 (Ano Hi no Mirai)" on November 2. Their second album, Sign, was released on February 1, 2006.

They released two more singles in 2006: "憧れの果て (Akogare no Hate)" on July 19, and "右手の在処 (Migite no Arika)" on November 8. Their next single, "Day by day", was released on February 14, 2007.

Their third album, Allegro, was released on March 14, 2007. After the release of Allegro, the band did not release any more albums or singles for nearly a year and a half. But finally, on August 13, 2008, they released a new single, "Can't Explain".

No Regret Life released their fourth album Wheels of Fortune on October 22, 2008. This album contains 10 songs. There are 2 promotional videos (PV) Can't Explain (from their previous single) and ハルカカナタ(Haruka Kanata). In July 2010, the band started their own label, Spiral-Motion.

In December 2012, the band's bassist Genta Matsumura left the band, stating he "doesn't have the strength to go on with the band anymore."

After having a discussion as a band, No Regret Life decided that they would be ending their activities together, holding one final tour before disbanding in July 2013.

== Member Profiles ==
Kazusō Oda (小田和奏) "Coda"

- Birthdate: January 17, 1980
- Place of Birth: Hiroshima Prefecture
- Vocals & Guitar

Ryūta Hashiguchi (橋口竜太)

- Birthdate: December 31, 1981
- Place of Birth: Kagoshima Prefecture
- Drums & Background Vocals

Genta Matsumura (松村元太)

- Birthdate: July 9, 1979
- Place of Birth: Kanagawa Prefecture
- Bass & Background Vocals

Yuka Shimokariya (下仮屋ユカ)

- Birthdate: May 24, 1979
- Place of Birth: Kimotsuki-cho
- Bass

== Discography ==
=== Albums ===
Tomorrow is the Another Day (November 7, 2002)

1. "旅立ちは今 (Tabi-tachi wa Ima)"
2. "Friendship"
3. "Walk"
4. "Tomorrow is the Another Day"
5. "The Human Song"
6. "雨上がりの街 (Ame Agari no Machi)"
7. "道標 (Michishirube)"
8. "青空 (Aozora)"
9. "魂が揺れている (Tamashi ga Yureteiru)"
10. "風の中 (Kaze no Naka)"

Sign (February 1, 2006)

1. "Melody (メロディー)"
2. "Nishimuki (西向き Facing West)"
3. "Ano Hi no Mirai (あの日の未来 The Future of That Day)"
4. "Sono Shunkan ni (その瞬間に In That Moment)"
5. "Tobira (扉 Door)"
6. "Secret Sign"
7. "Orange (オレンジ)"
8. "Nakushita Kotoba (失くした言葉 Lost Words)"
9. "Natsu no Gogo (夏の午後 Summer Afternoon)"
10. "Sayonara ga Hajimaru (さよならがはじまる The Beginning of Goodbye)"
11. "Monochrome (モノクローム)"
12. "Life"

Allegro (March 14, 2007)

1. "Fanfare (ファンファーレ)"
2. "Tegakari (手がかり Clue)"
3. "Akogare no Hate (憧れの果て The End of Longing) (Album Edition)"
4. "Miscast wa Dare da (ミスキャストは誰だ Who is Miscast?)"
5. "Day by day"
6. "Sekai ga Nemutteiru Aida ni (世界が眠っている間に While the World Sleeps)"
7. "Laundry (ランドリー)"
8. "Kid (キッド)"
9. "Migite no Arika (右手の在処 In My Right Hand)"
10. "Kimimachi (君待ち As You Wait)"
11. "Hello, my friend"
12. "Andante (アンダンテ)"

Wheels of Fortune (October 22, 2008)

1. "Haruka Kanata (ハルカカナタ Faraway)"
2. "Ambitious Man"
3. "Smile"
4. "Can't Explain"
5. "Shiranu Ma ni (知らぬ間に Before I Know It)"
6. "Stranger (ストレンジャー)"
7. "Parasite City (パラサイトシティ)"
8. "Empty Bottle"
9. "1980"
10. "Yorokobi no Uta (ヨロコビノウタ Pleasure Song)"

Discovery (September 21, 2011)

1. "Heart is Beating 62"
2. "The Sun"
3. "Wonderful World"
4. "Clocks"
5. "ハローグッバイ - Hello Goodbye"
6. "interlude"
7. "Tonight Is The Night"
8. "Suggestion"
9. "スローモーション"
10. "夢のあと – Yume no Ato"
11. "Life is a Symphony"

=== Mini-Albums ===
My Life, My Song, My Mind (April 2004)

1. "Wonderful World"
2. "Only Lonely"
3. "いつかの夢 (Itsuka no Yume)"
4. "静寂の歌 (Seijaku no Uta)"
5. "現在に在る(ここにある) (Genzai ni Aru (Koko ni Aru))

"Magical Destiny" (September 23, 2010)

1. "Tonight Is The Night"
2. "In The Morning"
3. "Like A Coaster"
4. "Cloudy"
5. "Don't Stop The Music"

=== Singles ===
"メロディー (Melody)" (February 9, 2005)

1. "メロディー (Melody)"
2. "タイムリミット (Time Limit)"
3. "せつなさの向こう側 (Setsunasa no Mukōgawa)"

"失くした言葉 (Nakushita Kotoba)" (June 8, 2005)

1. "失くした言葉 (Nakushita Kotoba)"
2. "ラストスマイル (Last Smile)"
3. "その瞬間に (Sono Shunkan ni)"

"あの日の未来 (Ano Hi no Mirai)" (November 2, 2005)

1. "あの日の未来 (Ano Hi no Mirai)"
2. "迫る夕暮れ (Semaru Yuugure)"
3. "扉 (Tobira)"

"憧れの果て (Akogare no Hate)" (July 19, 2006)

1. "憧れの果て (Akogare no Hate)"
2. "六月に浮かぶ (Rokugatsu ni Ukabu)"
3. "微熱 (Binetsu)"

"右手の在処 (Migite no Arika)" (November 8, 2006)

1. "右手の在処 (Migite no Arika)"
2. "キッド (Kid)"
3. "記憶の糸 (Kioku no Ito)"

"Day by day" (February 14, 2007)

1. "Day by day"
2. "レール (Rail)"
3. "am"

"Can't Explain" (August 13, 2008)

1. "Can't Explain"
2. "Mountaintop"
3. "ある光 (Aru Hikari)"
