= JoJo's Bizarre Adventure: Diamond Is Unbreakable =

Third season of JoJo's Bizarre Adventure anime

- Season 3
- Key visual of the series' "Bites the Dust" arc
- No. of episodes: 39

Release
- Original network: Tokyo MX
- Original release: April 2 – December 24, 2016

Season chronology
- ← Previous; Season 2: Stardust; Crusaders Next → Season 4: Golden; Wind

JoJo's Bizarre Adventure: Diamond Is Unbreakable (Japanese: ジョジョの奇妙な冒険 ダイヤモンドは砕けない, Hepburn: JoJo no Kimyō na Bōken Daiyamondo wa Kudakenai) is the third season of the JoJo's Bizarre Adventure anime by David Production, based on the JoJo's Bizarre Adventure manga series by Hirohiko Araki. This season covers Part 4 of the manga, titled Diamond Is Unbreakable. Set in 1999, the season follows the adventures of Josuke Higashikata, the illegitimate son of Joseph Joestar, as he and his new friends hunt for an evasive magical bow and arrow which has granted people dangerous Stand powers, uprooting Josuke's previously quiet life in his home town of Morioh.

The anime adaptation of Diamond is Unbreakable was announced at the end of "The Last Crusaders" event for the JoJo's Bizarre Adventure: Stardust Crusaders anime in Tokyo on October 24, 2015; a teaser trailer was uploaded to Warner Bros. Japan's YouTube channel shortly after. The series was directed by Naokatsu Tsuda and Toshiyuki Kato, with the screenplay by Yasuko Kobayashi, character designs by Terumi Nishii, and the score composed once again by Yugo Kanno. Diamond Is Unbreakable aired in Japan between April 2, and December 24, 2016, and was simulcast by Crunchyroll. (Note: Tokyo MX lists the series as premiering at 24:30 on Friday, which is effectively Saturday at 12:30 a.m. JST.) The opening theme for the first 14 episodes is "Crazy Noisy Bizarre Town" performed by The DU, (Jun Shirota, Daisuke Wada, and Jeity), the theme for episodes 15–26 is "Chase" performed by pop rock band Batta, and the theme for episode 27 onwards is "Great Days" by Daisuke Hasegawa and Karen Aoki. The ending theme is the 1996 single "I Want You" by Australian pop group Savage Garden. The ending theme for episode 39 is "Great Days Units ver." by JO☆UNITED (Hiroaki "Tommy" Tominaga, Coda, Jin Hashimoto, Jun Shirota, Daisuke Wada, Jeity, Tatsu Hoshino, Daisuke Hasegawa, and Karen Aoki).

An original video animation (OVA) episode based on the Thus Spoke Kishibe Rohan spin-off manga was distributed in 2017 to those who purchased every DVD or Blu-ray release of the series. A second OVA was released with a special edition of the manga's second volume on July 19, 2018.

On July 6, 2018, Viz Media announced that the series would air on Adult Swim's Toonami; episodes began broadcasting on August 19, 2018.

== Plot ==
Set around mid-1999 in Japan, Jotaro Kujo tracks down Josuke Higashikata, the illegitimate son of Joseph Joestar, to help him find a supernatural bow and arrow which grants people Stand powers. Along the way, Josuke and his friends discover that a Stand-using serial killer named Yoshikage Kira is on the loose in their hometown of Morioh, armed with an explosive Stand named Killer Queen. Josuke's group corners the murderer, but he escapes by changing his face to that of businessman Kosaku Kawajiri and assumes his identity. Though Kira gains a new ability named Bites the Dust that can create a time loop, Kosaku's son Hayato tricks him into revealing his identity, leading to his defeat by Josuke and his allies.

== Voice cast ==
Character	Japanese	English
Josuke Higashikata	Yuki Ono	Billy Kametz
Jotaro Kujo	Daisuke Ono	Matthew Mercer
Koichi Hirose	Yuki Kaji	Zach Aguilar
Okuyasu Nijimura	Wataru Takagi	Jalen K. Cassell
Rohan Kishibe	Takahiro Sakurai	Vic Mignogna
Reimi Sugimoto	Sayuri Hara	Kira Buckland
Hayato Kawajiri	Rina Satō	Laura Stahl
Yoshikage Kira	Toshiyuki Morikawa	D. C. Douglas
Yoshihiro Kira	Shigeru Chiba	Steve Kramer
Tomoko Higashikata	Megumi Toyoguchi (eps. 1–15)	Allegra Clark
Tomoko Higashikata	Shizuka Itō (eps. 31–39)	Allegra Clark
Ryohei Higashikata	Katsuhisa Hōki	Michael Sorich
Joseph Joestar	Unsho Ishizuka	Richard Epcar
Anjuro "Angelo" Katagiri	Kenji Hamada	Lex Lang
Keicho Nijimura	Tomoyuki Shimura	Jason Marnocha
Akira Otoishi	Showtaro Morikubo	Andrew Russell
Tamami Kobayashi	Satoshi Tsuruoka	Frank Todaro
Toshikazu Hazamada	Hiroki Shimowada	Lucien Dodge
Yukako Yamagishi	Mamiko Noto	Faye Mata
Tonio Trussardi	Tokuyoshi Kawashima	Christopher Bevins
Shizuka Joestar	Taeko Kawata	Kaitlyn Robrock
Shigekiyo "Shigechi" Yangu	Kappei Yamaguchi	Brian Beacock
Aya Tsuji	Sayaka Ohara	Katelyn Gault
Ken Oyanagi	Chika Sakamoto	Laila Berzins
Mikitaka Hazekura	Yasuyuki Kase	Mark Whitten
Yuya Fungami	Kishō Taniyama	Phillip Reich
Toyohiro Kanedaichi	Kōichi Tōchika	Sean Chiplock
Terunosuke Miyamoto	Kengo Kawanishi	Alan Lee
Masazo Kinoto	Makoto Ishii	Stefan Martello
Shinobu Kawajiri	Yū Shimamura	Jennifer Losi
Nijimura's Father	Naomi Kusumi	Kellen Goff
Kai Harada	Bucky Koba	David Vincent
Narrator	Tōru Ōkawa	David Vincent

== Episode list ==
No. overall (Note: Order of episodes in the series continuing from the previous season)	No. in season (Note: Order of episodes within the season)	Title (Note: English episode titles are taken from Crunchyroll. In instances where names are altered from the Japanese version, the original Japanese translation is used on the left while the edited Crunchyroll title is used on the right.)	Storyboarded by	Directed by	Written by	Original release date	English air date
75	1	"Jotaro Kujo! Meets Josuke Higashikata"; Transliteration: "Kūjō Jōtarō! Higashikata Jōsuke ni Au" (Japanese: 空条承太郎！ 東方仗助に会う)	Naokatsu Tsuda	Yūta Takamura	Yasuko Kobayashi	April 2, 2016	August 19, 2018
In April 1999, Jotaro Kujo, now a marine explorer, travels to the Japanese town of Morioh where he meets two high school freshmen, Koichi Hirose and Josuke Higashikata. Josuke has a Stand, Crazy Diamond; (Note: In the official English releases, Crazy Diamond is named "Shining Diamond".) it can revert objects to previous states, which includes restoring destroyed objects and healing wounds, though Josuke is incapable of healing his own wounds. Jotaro informs Josuke that he is the illegitimate son of Jotaro's grandfather Joseph Joestar and will receive some of Joseph's inheritance. After school, Josuke encounters a convenience store robbery and incapacitates the robber after he insults Josuke's hair. Josuke discovers that the robber was being possessed by Aqua Necklace, a water-controlling Stand used by escaped serial killer Anjuro "Angelo" Katagiri. Aqua Necklace escapes into the sewers while threatening to kill Josuke; Angelo later stalks Josuke's home in disguise as a milkman.
76	2	"Josuke Higashikata! Meets Angelo"; Transliteration: "Higashikata Jōsuke! Anjero ni Au" (Japanese: 東方仗助！ アンジェロに会う)	Toshiyuki Katō	Toshiyuki Katō	Yasuko Kobayashi	April 9, 2016	August 26, 2018
Unable to trick Josuke's mother Tomoko into consuming Aqua Necklace while in his milkman disguise, Angelo sends Aqua Necklace through a water pipe so it can kill her. After she unknowingly consumes Aqua Necklace, Josuke extracts it from her body by punching through her with Crazy Diamond and immediately healing her, then traps Aqua Necklace inside a bottle. Angelo disguises Aqua Necklace as Cognac, tricking Josuke's grandfather Ryohei (the man who arrested Angelo) into drinking and being killed by it. Though Josuke uses Crazy Diamond to restore Ryohei's body, he cannot revive him from death. Josuke and Jotaro wait out Angelo at Josuke's house for three days before realizing that he was biding his time until a rainy day. The two are overwhelmed by Aqua Necklace freely moving through puddles and steam until it enters Josuke's mouth; however, Josuke had secretly swallowed a shredded rubber glove earlier and uses Crazy Diamond to restore it, trapping Aqua Necklace inside. Josuke and Jotaro find Angelo, and Josuke pummels Angelo against a nearby rock, using Crazy Diamond to fuse the two together.
77	3	"The Nijimura Brothers, Part 1"; Transliteration: "Nijimura Kyōdai, Sono 1" (Japanese: 虹村兄弟 その1)	Takahiko Yoshida	Takahiko Yoshida	Yasuko Kobayashi	April 16, 2016	September 9, 2018
Angelo reveals to Josuke and Jotaro that, before his execution, he received his Stand ability when a man in a school uniform shot him with a centuries-old bow and arrow while mentioning the name of the Joestar family's enemy, Dio. Angelo attempts to use this discussion to distract the two while he attacks a nearby child with Aqua Necklace. When Angelo insults Josuke's hair, Josuke completely fuses Angelo with the stone, rendering Aqua Necklace inert. Realizing that the bow and arrow may be what originally gave Dio his Stand, Jotaro decides to remain in Morioh to investigate. The next day, Josuke and Koichi pass by a derelict house where Josuke is antagonized by Okuyasu Nijimura. As they talk, Okuyasu's older brother Keicho fires an arrow from the house's window into Koichi's neck. Josuke is kept from aiding Koichi by Okuyasu, whose Stand The Hand can eradicate anything its right hand swipes through and instantly close the gap left afterwards. Josuke tricks Okuyasu into removing the space between him and some nearby potted plants, which launch towards Okuyasu and knock him out. Keicho drags Koichi inside the house, so Josuke follows them.
78	4	"The Nijimura Brothers, Part 2"; Transliteration: "Nijimura Kyōdai, Sono 2" (Japanese: 虹村兄弟 その2)	Yūta Takamura	Yasufumi Soejima, Toshiyuki Katō, Naokatsu Tsuda, Yūta Takamura	Shōgo Yasukawa	April 23, 2016	September 16, 2018
As Josuke enters the house, Keicho attempts to attack him with his Stand Bad Company, (Note: In the official English releases, Bad Company is named "Worse Company".) which conjures an army of toy soldiers complete with tanks and helicopters, but Keicho accidentally hits Okuyasu when he tries to attack Josuke from behind. Josuke quickly takes Okuyasu outside and uses Crazy Diamond to treat Okuyasu's wounds, though his hand is injured by Bad Company. He then reenters the house and finds Koichi in a booby-trapped second floor room. Okuyasu repays the favor by swiping at the air to bring Koichi towards Josuke, then remains outside to stay neutral in the ensuing fight. Josuke heals Koichi before the two attempt to escape from Keicho, who reveals that Koichi has awakened a Stand. Keicho forces Koichi to summon his Stand, a seemingly useless egg. Disappointed, Keicho once again targets Josuke, who uses Crazy Diamond's ability to fire Bad Company's own missiles back at Keicho.
79	5	"The Nijimura Brothers, Part 3"; Transliteration: "Nijimura Kyōdai, Sono 3" (Japanese: 虹村兄弟 その3)	Toshiyuki Katō	Yukihiko Asaki	Shōgo Yasukawa	April 30, 2016	September 23, 2018
Josuke and Koichi reach the attic where the bow and arrow are; they also find the Nijimura brothers' father, a former servant of Dio's who mutated into a mindless creature after Dio died (Note: Dio's death is depicted in episode 48 of JoJo's Bizarre Adventure: Stardust Crusaders.) and the flesh bud Dio put in his head lost control. Keicho explains that he has been searching for a Stand user who can kill his father, who cannot be killed by conventional means and seems obsessed with searching through an old chest. Josuke uses Crazy Diamond to restore a torn-up photograph of the Nijimura family inside the chest, hinting that the father still retains memories of his old life. Just as Josuke offers to help Keicho and Okuyasu find a way to cure their father in exchange for the bow and arrow, Keicho is attacked by the electrical Stand, Red Hot Chili Pepper, (Note: In the official English releases, Red Hot Chili Pepper is named "Chili Pepper".) who steals the bow and arrow and kills Keicho by dragging him through an electrical outlet. As Jotaro receives a warning from Red Hot Chili Pepper's user not to interfere any further, Okuyasu decides to befriend Josuke and go to school with him.
80	6	"Koichi Hirose (Echoes) / Koichi Hirose (Reverb)"; Transliteration: "Hirose Koichi (Ekōzu)" (Japanese: 広瀬康一 (エコーズ))	Yasufumi Soejima	Yasufumi Soejima	Kazuyuki Fudeyasu	May 7, 2016	September 30, 2018
Tamami Kobayashi tries to blackmail Koichi into paying for the cat Koichi seemingly ran over with his bike. Tamami brings out his Stand The Lock to literally weigh Koichi down with guilt. Okuyasu and Josuke soon arrive to help him, but after Okuyasu gently punches Tamami, Tamami tricks him into feeling guilty, causing him to also fall under the thrall of The Lock. Josuke discovers that the cat was fake and heals Tamami's injuries, freeing both Koichi and Okuyasu from their locks, though Tamami flees with Koichi's money. Upon arriving home, Koichi is shocked to find Tamami, who tricks Koichi's mother into thinking Koichi had stolen from him and puts both her and Koichi's sister under The Lock's power. Koichi's anger causes his Stand egg to hatch into Echoes, (Note: In the official English releases, Echoes is named "Reverb".) whose ability is to plant literal sound effects on whatever it touches, driving Tamami crazy with repeated sounds. Tamami tries to take his revenge by tricking Koichi's mother and sister into thinking Koichi had stabbed him, aiming to drive Koichi's mother to kill herself. Koichi uses Echoes' ability to convince his mother to believe in him, freeing both her and his sister from The Lock. Tamami resigns himself to being Koichi's servant.
81	7	"Toshikazu Hazamada (Surface) / Toshikazu Hazamada (Show Off)"; Transliteration: "Hazamada Toshikazu (Sāfisu)" (Japanese: 間田敏和 (サーフィス))	Satoshi Ōsedo	Hitomi Ezoe	Shin'ichi Inotsume	May 14, 2016	October 7, 2018
Tamami informs Josuke and Koichi about a Stand user in their school named Toshikazu Hazamada who allegedly caused his friend to gouge his own eye out. While investigating Hazamada's locker, Josuke comes across Hazamada's Stand Surface, (Note: In the official English releases, Surface is named "Show Off".) a wooden dummy which turns into a copy of Josuke and takes control of his movements. After seemingly defeating both Josuke and Koichi, Hazamada aims to use his Josuke copy to lure Jotaro into a trap, attacking two bikers on the way. Having used their respective abilities to protect each other from Hazamada's attack, Josuke and Koichi use their Stands' powers to meet up with Jotaro before Hazamada and Surface. Surface takes control of Josuke and tries to have him kill Jotaro in his stead, but the bikers, who Josuke had healed earlier, assault Hazamada, freeing Josuke from his control.
82	8	"Yukako Yamagishi Falls in Love, Part 1"; Transliteration: "Yamagishi Yukako wa Koi o Suru, Sono 1" (Japanese: 山岸由花子は恋をする その1)	Jirō Fujimoto	Jirō Fujimoto	Shōgo Yasukawa	May 21, 2016	October 14, 2018
Koichi meets with his classmate Yukako Yamagishi, who confesses her love for him while also losing her temper at the thought of being turned down. When she leaves, Koichi realizes that her hair has been left behind in his drink. The next day, Yukako becomes angered with the class representative for insulting Koichi; she uses her Stand Love Deluxe, which allows her to control her own hair, to attempt to burn the class rep alive. After Josuke and Okuyasu arrive to save the class rep, they warn Koichi about Yukako's Stand and encourage him to try and act like a delinquent so that she will lose interest. The plan backfires when Yukako kidnaps Koichi and brings him to an abandoned summer villa, where she begins torturing him in an attempt to mold him into the perfect gentleman.
83	9	"Yukako Yamagishi Falls in Love, Part 2"; Transliteration: "Yamagishi Yukako wa Koi o Suru, Sono 2" (Japanese: 山岸由花子は恋をする その2)	Toshiyuki Katō	Kim Min-sun	Shōgo Yasukawa	May 28, 2016	October 21, 2018
While looking for a way to escape, Koichi finds a nearby payphone and uses Echoes' ability to trick Yukako into contacting Josuke, which clues him and Okuyasu in on their location. As Koichi attempts to survive Yukako's fury until Josuke arrives, Echoes suddenly evolves into a new form, Echoes Act 2, which can turn the sound effects it writes into real actions when touched. Yukako endures several counterattacks from Act 2, but she is literally blown away onto a nearby cliff, which gives way underneath her. Just as Yukako falls towards some sharp rocks below, she is saved by bouncy sound effects already placed there by Koichi, turning them into harmless springs. As Koichi reunites with Josuke and Okuyasu, Yukako gains a new admiration for Koichi, who had saved her despite everything she had done to him.
84	10	"Let's Go Eat Some Italian Food"; Transliteration: "Itaria Ryōri o Tabe ni Ikō" (Japanese: イタリア料理を食べに行こう)	Fumiaki Kōta	Fumiaki Kōta, Hikaru Murata	Kazuyuki Fudeyasu	June 4, 2016	October 28, 2018
On their way to Keicho's grave, Josuke and Okuyasu come across an Italian restaurant called Trattoria Trussardi, (Note: In the official English releases, Trattoria Trussardi is named "Trattoria Trendy".) run by Chef Tonio Trussardi, (Note: In the official English releases, Tonio Trussard is named "Tonio Trendy".) who makes dishes based on his observations of his customers. Okuyasu is delighted by each of Tonio's dishes; however, upon consuming them, he experiences violent reactions within his body, such as his eyes being squeezed of their moisture and his teeth launching out, only to ultimately find that the reactions have benefited him by curing his various maladies. Growing suspicious, Josuke discovers that Tonio had been supplementing his dishes with his Stand, Pearl Jam, (Note: In the official English releases, Pearl Jam is named "Pole Jam".) and confronts him. Although Tonio initially appears hostile, Josuke quickly discovers that Tonio's anger only came from Josuke not washing his hands before entering the kitchen. Tonio's benevolent intentions are revealed to be genuine; he senses maladies his customers may be ailing from, then creates dishes that he infuses with Pearl Jam to heals his customers and improve their health. Tonio then puts Josuke to work scrubbing the kitchen to repent for his intrusion. Meanwhile, Jotaro meets with a representative of the Speedwagon Foundation, who informs him that Joseph Joestar is on his way to Morioh.
85	11	"Red Hot Chili Pepper, Part 1 / Chili Pepper, Part 1"; Transliteration: "Reddo Hotto Chiri Peppā, Sono 1" (Japanese: レッド・ホット・チリ・ペッパー その1)	Susumu Nishizawa	Eum Sang-yong	Yasuko Kobayashi	June 11, 2016	November 4, 2018
Red Hot Chili Pepper challenges Josuke at his home to see if he is strong enough to take on Jotaro and Star Platinum. Despite Crazy Diamond's show of strength and speed, Red Hot Chili Pepper holds his own before retreating. The next day, Jotaro summons Josuke, Okuyasu, and Koichi to an isolated area, then informs them that Joseph, whose Stand Hermit Purple can potentially detect Red Hot Chili Pepper's user, is due to arrive at the port. Red Hot Chili Pepper, having hidden in Okuyasu's motorcycle's battery, emerges, having heard the whole conversation; he attempts to escape, only to be stopped by Okuyasu. Despite being severely weakened, Red Hot Chili Pepper goads Okuyasu into attacking him once more, unearthing an underground electrical cable which allows him to regain his strength. After cutting off Okuyasu's arm, Red Hot Chili Pepper drags the rest of his body into the cable. Josuke uses Crazy Diamond on Okuyasu's severed arm, which returns Okuyasu's body from the cable before he can be killed, and heals him. The group heads to the port to save Joseph from the ambush.
86	12	"Red Hot Chili Pepper, Part 2 / Chili Pepper, Part 2"; Transliteration: "Reddo Hotto Chiri Peppā, Sono 2" (Japanese: レッド・ホット・チリ・ペッパー その2)	Toshiyuki Katō	Yukihiko Asaki	Yasuko Kobayashi	June 18, 2016	November 11, 2018
Jotaro and Okuyasu board a ship to rendezvous with Joseph's while Josuke and Koichi stay on the docks, where they are confronted by Red Hot Chili Pepper's user, Akira Otoishi. Otoishi hides Red Hot Chili Pepper in the underground wires to launch surprise attacks on Josuke from all directions, but Josuke turns the surrounding asphalt back into coal tar, allowing him to predict Red Hot Chili Pepper's movements. Angered, Otoishi uses all the electricity in Morioh Town to power Red Hot Chili Pepper up. However, Josuke traps Red Hot Chili Pepper in a tire and tricks him into bursting out, causing the air inside to blow him into the ocean. The combination of the ocean's size and the conductivity of saltwater causes Red Hot Chili Pepper to dissolve. Otoishi survives and sneaks onto Joseph's boat disguised as a member of the Speedwagon Foundation, but Okuyasu stumbles across Otoishi and an actual Speedwagon Foundation member, each of whom claim the other is an imposter. With no time to think as Red Hot Chili Pepper approaches Joseph, Okuyasu punches Otoishi first (planning to punch both men if need be), causing Red Hot Chili Pepper to disappear. As the vessel makes landfall, Josuke finally meets Joseph.
87	13	"We Picked Up Something Crazy!"; Transliteration: "Yabaimono o Hirottassu!" (Japanese: やばいものを拾ったっス！)	Taizō Yoshida	Jirō Fujimoto	Shin'ichi Inotsume	June 25, 2016	November 25, 2018
Jotaro retrieves the bow and arrow and urges the others to be careful of any other Stand users that might have been created. As Josuke tries to escort Joseph back to his house to meet Tomoko, Joseph finds a baby girl, who has been rendered invisible by her own uncontrollable Stand, Achtung Baby. After buying a large amount of baby accessories with Josuke's credit card, Joseph attempts to add clothes and makeup to the baby to make her visible. However, Achtung Baby activates when she starts crying, causing everything around her, including Joseph's hands, to turn invisible. As the baby gets more upset and her Stand's powers strengthen, her stroller rolls away into a nearby river. Needing to find the baby before she drowns, Joseph slits open his wrist, using his blood to render her visible. Josuke, amazed by Joseph's self-sacrifice, saves Joseph and the baby and now sees his father in a better light. However, he later discovers the sales receipt in Joseph's pocket and is enraged to learn that Joseph had spent nearly all of Josuke's savings on baby goods.
88	14	"Let's Go to the Manga Artist's House, Part 1"; Transliteration: "Mangaka no Uchi e Asobi ni Ikō, Sono 1" (Japanese: 漫画家のうちへ遊びに行こう その1)	Naokatsu Tsuda	Naokatsu Tsuda, Yasufumi Soejima, Toshiyuki Katō, Yukihiko Asaki	Yasuko Kobayashi	July 2, 2016	December 2, 2018
Upon discovering their mutual interest in the manga Pink Dark Boy, Hazamada brings Koichi to the home of its artist, Rohan Kishibe, who gives them a tour of his studio. Koichi and Hazamada sneak a peek at Rohan's new manuscript. The moment they do this, they fall under the power of Rohan's Stand, Heaven's Door, which allows him to open their bodies like a book and read all of their secrets. Rohan, unaware of what Stands are, learns after reading from Koichi's encounters with other Stand users. He then writes in one of Koichi's pages that he cannot attack Rohan, which then prevents Koichi from doing so. He goes on to take pages from both Koichi and Hazamada as material for his manga, leaving them with no memory of what just happened. That night, Koichi senses something amiss when he discovers he has lost 20kg, but suddenly forgets about it just as he prepares to inform Josuke. The next day, Koichi finds himself having thoughtlessly approached Rohan's house again, with Josuke and Okuyasu following closely behind.
89	15	"Let's Go to the Manga Artist's House, Part 2"; Transliteration: "Mangaka no Uchi e Asobi ni Ikō, Sono 2" (Japanese: 漫画家のうちへ遊びに行こう その2)	Yasufumi Soejima	Tadahito Matsubayashi	Yasuko Kobayashi	July 9, 2016	December 9, 2018
Rohan plans to keep taking pages from Koichi to inspire his manga works, with the safety lock written inside Koichi preventing him from asking Josuke and Okuyasu for help. However, Josuke and Okuyasu deduce what is happening from a wound on Koichi's hand and head inside Rohan's house. Rohan uses his manuscript to put Okuyasu under Heaven's Door's power, writing an instruction that will cause him to commit suicide if Josuke tries to help him. Josuke attacks Rohan directly, closing his eyes to prevent himself from viewing his manuscript. Learning of Josuke's weakness from Koichi's pages, Rohan insults Josuke's hairstyle to provoke him into opening his eyes; however, this backfires as Josuke enters a blind rage, allowing him to beat Rohan to a pulp and wreck his manga studio. When Okuyasu wonders why Josuke is so protective of his hair, Koichi explains that when Josuke was four years old, around the same time Jotaro and Joseph fought Dio, he came down with a deadly fever. When Josuke and Tomoko got stuck in a blizzard on their way to the hospital, a student with a regent hairstyle helped them get moving, inspiring Josuke to copy his hairstyle and take offense to anyone who insults it.
90	16	"Let's Go Hunting!"; Transliteration: "Hantingu ni Ikō!" (Japanese: 狩り(ハンティング)に行こう！)	Yoriyasu Kogawa	Yoriyasu Kogawa	Shōgo Yasukawa	July 16, 2016	December 16, 2018
Jotaro brings Josuke along with him to track down a rat that had been turned into a Stand user by Otoishi, teaching him how to fire ball bearings along the way. During their search, the pair discover several rat corpses that had been melted from the inside and merged into a gelatinous flesh cube. Investigating an abandoned house, Josuke comes up against the rat, who had merged the home's owners in the same way. Withstanding Josuke's initial attack, the rat attacks with its Stand, Ratt, a miniature cannon that shoots needles that cause their targets to melt. Josuke dodges, and the rat succumbs to its injuries and dies. Jotaro encounters a second rat with the same ability, nicknamed Bug-Eaten, which escapes out of the house. While pursuing Bug-Eaten, Josuke falls into a trap that they had set up for the rats and gets hit by one of Ratt's needles, though is saved by Star Platinum's time-stopping ability. Jotaro then uses himself as bait to lure out Bug-Eaten, tasking Josuke with pinpointing its location and shooting it with live rounds. Despite the pressure put on him by Jotaro's increasing injuries, Josuke lures Bug-Eaten out into the open, allowing him to make the kill shot.
91	17	"Rohan Kishibe's Adventure"; Transliteration: "Kishibe Rohan no Bōken" (Japanese: 岸辺露伴の冒険)	Sōichi Shimada	Sōichi Shimada	Shin'ichi Inotsume	July 23, 2016	January 6, 2019
Rohan brings Koichi along to investigate a mysterious alleyway not marked on the town map. As they go around corners, they keep finding themselves on the same street with a mailbox. They are then approached by a girl named Reimi Sugimoto, who reveals that both she and her dog Arnold are ghosts who were murdered fifteen years ago. Explaining that the alleyway is a realm between the worlds of the living and the dead, Reimi informs Rohan and Koichi that the man who murdered her has been secretly killing others to this day and asks them to stop him so that she can move on. After they agree, Reimi points them towards the exit, warning them not to turn around as they will be pulled into the afterlife by the disembodied hands of dark spirits. Just as they near the exit, the spirits trick Koichi into turning around, but Rohan gets both of them to safety with Heaven's Door. Afterwards, Rohan meets an old monk at Reimi's grave, who reveals that on the night Reimi was murdered, she was babysitting Rohan and helped him escape before she was killed. Meanwhile, a man named Yoshikage Kira drives home with a woman's severed hand, talking to it and treating it as his lover.
92	18	"Shigechi's Harvest, Part 1"; Transliteration: "Shigechī no Hāvesuto, Sono 1" (Japanese: ｢重ちー｣の収穫(ハーヴェスト) その1)	Eri Nagata	Eri Nagata	Kazuyuki Fudeyasu	July 30, 2016	January 13, 2019
Josuke and Okuyasu spot a group of hornet-shaped Stands, known as Harvest, picking up loose change from under soda machines, ATMs, and mailboxes, and chase them back to their user, a middle school student named Shigekiyo "Shigechi" Yangu. Learning how much money Shigechi made just from loose change, Josuke and Okuyasu strike up a business friendship with him, using Harvest to search for discarded stickers and vouchers that can be exchanged for larger cash rewards. However, their relationship sours when Shigechi greedily gives the duo only a small fraction of the money earned rather than splitting it evenly. During their search, the boys find a winning lottery ticket with a 5 million yen jackpot, a prize that Shigechi is reluctant to share with Josuke and Okuyasu.
93	19	"Shigechi's Harvest, Part 2"; Transliteration: "Shigechī no Hāvesuto, Sono 2" (Japanese: ｢重ちー｣の収穫(ハーヴェスト) その2)	Shinpei Nagai	Masami Hata, Kim Min-sun	Kazuyuki Fudeyasu	August 6, 2016	January 20, 2019
Josuke, Okuyasu, and Shigechi go to the bank to collect the lottery reward, where the bank teller finds a name and number written on the back of the ticket. Just as the teller contacts the person written on the ticket, Josuke uses Crazy Diamond's power to change the name on the ticket, allowing the boys to successfully claim the promissory note for the prize. However, when Shigechi tries to claim the prize for himself, Josuke and Okuyasu try to stop him. As they chase after Shigechi, he uses Harvest to inject alcohol into them, causing them to become drunk and defenseless. Outnumbered by Harvest, Okuyasu uses the Hand to retrieve the prize, which Josuke rips into shreds, as only Josuke can restore it with Crazy Diamond. He then sends the shreds into the wind; Harvest scatters to retrieve them, leaving Shigechi defenseless. After a beatdown and some heavy scolding from Josuke and Okuyasu, Shigechi repents and agrees to split the money evenly between them.
94	20	"Yukako Yamagishi Dreams of Cinderella"; Transliteration: "Yamagishi Yukako wa Shinderera ni Akogareru" (Japanese: 山岸由花子はシンデレラに憧れる)	Jirō Fujimoto, Naokatsu Tsuda	Jirō Fujimoto	Shōgo Yasukawa	August 13, 2016	January 27, 2019
While downhearted over Koichi, Yukako comes across an aesthetician named Aya Tsuji, whose Stand, Cinderella, can replace parts of its target's body. Aya slightly remodels Yukako's face so that Koichi will fall in love with her. Finding the treatment effective but temporary, Yukako returns to Aya and deduces that she is a Stand user. Even knowing this, Yukako undergoes a full body treatment before going on a date with Koichi. After a moment of luck, Yukako manages to get a kiss from Koichi, who starts to fall in love with her. However, after forgetting to apply a lipstick that Aya instructed her to apply periodically, Yukako's modification starts to fall apart, leaving her without even her original face. She furiously returns to Aya's and is tailed by Koichi, who recognizes her from her personality. Aya challenges Yukako with picking her own face out of several variant copies she has made, with the wrong one doomed to leave her ugly forever. As Yukako struggles to find her own face (which Aya intentionally omitted from the copies), she leaves the choice to Koichi, who offers to have Aya make him blind if he is wrong. Sensing Koichi's true love for Yukako, Aya restores Yukako to her original beauty.
95	21	"Yoshikage Kira Just Wants to Live Quietly, Part 1"; Transliteration: "Kira Yoshikage wa Shizuka ni Kurashitai, Sono 1" (Japanese: 吉良吉影は静かに暮らしたい その1)	Yoriyasu Kogawa	Eum Sang-yong	Yasuko Kobayashi	August 20, 2016	February 3, 2019
Kira goes out on a "date" with the severed hand of one of his victims; he buys a sandwich and eats it at a park, later hiding the hand inside the sandwich's paper bag. Shigechi, who is also at the park, picks up Kira's bag by mistake after his own is stolen by a dog. Fearing that the police will trace the hand back to him if it's discovered, Kira tails Shigechi, hoping to retrieve his bag before Shigechi can look inside. Following him into the gym at Shigechi's school, Kira is forced to hide when Josuke and Okuyasu show up to eat their lunch as well. Kira claims the bag but is discovered by Shigechi. He tries to use Harvest to pull the bag away, tearing it and revealing the hand. Refusing to let Shigechi escape alive, Kira brings out his own Stand, Killer Queen. (Note: In the official English releases, Killer Queen is named "Deadly Queen".)
96	22	"Yoshikage Kira Just Wants to Live Quietly, Part 2"; Transliteration: "Kira Yoshikage wa Shizuka ni Kurashitai, Sono 2" (Japanese: 吉良吉影は静かに暮らしたい その2)	Toshiyuki Katō	Hitomi Ezoe	Yasuko Kobayashi	August 27, 2016	February 10, 2019
Kira uses Killer Queen's ability to turn anything into a bomb, using a coin to deal heavy damage to Shigechi. Shigechi attempts to reach Josuke to heal him, but Kira catches up and uses a doorknob as a bomb to kill him. In his final moments, Shigechi has Harvest bring Josuke a button that came off of Kira's jacket. Having seen Shigechi's soul pass through her realm, Reimi confirms to Josuke and the other allied Stand users that Shigechi was killed by the same person who murdered her, whom they quickly realize is another Stand user. A few days later, Jotaro and Koichi trace the button to a shoe shop where Kira's jacket is being repaired. Just as the shop's owner attempts to reveal his customer's name, he is killed by a small tank-like machine, a second bomb from Killer Queen called Sheer Heart Attack. (Note: In the official English releases, Sheer Heart Attack is named "Heart Attack".)
97	23	"Sheer Heart Attack, Part 1 / Heart Attack, Part 1"; Transliteration: "Shiā Hāto Atakku, Sono 1" (Japanese: シアーハートアタック その1)	Sōichi Shimada	Hikaru Murata	Shōgo Yasukawa	September 3, 2016	February 17, 2019
Kira retrieves his jacket and flees through the back; seeing this, Koichi wants to pursue but Jotaro advises against it. Jotaro assaults Sheer Heart Attack, which proves to be resilient to Star Platinum's attacks. Ignoring Jotaro's warning, Koichi sends Echoes to search for Kira, only to find he can remotely control Sheer Heart Attack from outside of Echoes' range. With Echoes too far away to recall in time, Koichi is almost attacked by Sheer Heart Attack. Deducing that Sheer Heart Attack uses body temperature to determine its primary target, Jotaro lights a fire to lure it away from Koichi, but gets critically injured by its amplified explosion. Thinking carefully, Koichi uses Echoes' ability to distract Sheer Heart Attack by attaching a sizzling lure to it while he calls Josuke. A malfunctioning stove heats up and becomes a higher priority for Sheer Heart Attack, rendering the lure useless. After Koichi is blown outside by Sheer Heart Attack's explosion, Echoes evolves into its third form, Echoes Act 3. It uses its new ability to significantly increase Sheer Heart Attack's weight, completely stopping its movements. Feeling the weight of the attack on his left hand while at a cafe, Kira is forced to return to retrieve his bomb.
98	24	"Sheer Heart Attack, Part 2 / Heart Attack, Part 2"; Transliteration: "Shiā Hāto Atakku, Sono 2" (Japanese: シアーハートアタック その2)	Sōichi Shimada	Yasufumi Soejima	Shōgo Yasukawa	September 10, 2016	February 24, 2019
While Josuke and Okuyasu make their way to the scene, Kira appears before Koichi. He knocks Koichi and Act 3 back, sending them far enough away that Sheer Heart Attack is out of Act 3's range and its movement is restored. As Act 3 is only able to immobilize one object, Koichi chooses Sheer Heart Attack, and is unable to stop Kira from brutally beating him. Koichi learns Kira's real name and mocks him, causing Kira to grievously wound him in a fit of rage. Before Kira can finish him off, Jotaro awakens and easily pummels Kira into submission with Star Platinum before losing consciousness again. As Josuke arrives with Okuyasu, he heals Jotaro and Koichi. Kira tries to pass himself off as an innocent bystander to get Josuke to heal him too, but Josuke sees through his deception. Kira then chops off his own hand to set Sheer Heart Attack loose while he escapes. Rather than fighting Sheer Heart Attack, Josuke uses Crazy Diamond's ability to heal Kira's severed hand and send it back to him, allowing Josuke and the others to track it to Aya's parlor. They find a faceless dead man and discover that Kira had forced Aya to replace his face with the dead man's; Kira then kills Aya with a bomb, allowing him to escape and go into hiding once again with a new identity.
99	25	"Atom Heart Father / Heart Father"; Transliteration: "Atomu Hāto Fāzā" (Japanese: アトム・ハート・ファーザー)	Eri Nagata	Eri Nagata	Shin'ichi Inotsume	September 17, 2016	March 3, 2019
Josuke and the others locate Kira's house and search through it, learning that he had been keeping a record of his fingernail clippings since his murder of Reimi. Just then, a nearby camera takes a picture of them; the photo contains the ghost of Kira's late father, Yoshihiro. Using his Stand, Atom Heart Father, (Note: In the official English releases, Atom Heart Father is named "Heart Father".) Yoshihiro traps Josuke and Jotaro within the confines of the photograph, with any damage done to the photo dealt to them as well. Jotaro tricks Yoshihiro into taking a picture of himself, freeing Josuke and Jotaro while trapping Yoshihiro inside a separate photograph. Though Josuke binds his photo to a post, Yoshihiro tricks Okuyasu into setting him free, retrieving another arrow that Kira had in his possession as he makes his escape. Elsewhere, Kira begins living under the new identity of the man whose face he stole, Kosaku Kawajiri, moving into his house with his wife Shinobu and their son Hayato.
100	26	"Janken Boy Is Coming!"; Transliteration: "Janken Kozō ga Yatte Kuru!" (Japanese: ジャンケン小僧がやって来る！)	Yasufumi Soejima	Kim Min-sun	Kazuyuki Fudeyasu	September 24, 2016	March 10, 2019
Yoshihiro uses the arrow to make more Stand-wielders to deter Josuke's group, first using it on a boy named Ken Oyanagi. Ken pesters Rohan to play rock paper scissors with him, losing his first match after Rohan uses Heaven's Door to figure out his move. As Ken continues to force Rohan to play rock paper scissors with him and wins his third match against Rohan, Ken's Stand, Boy II Man, (Note: In the official English releases, Boy II Man is named "Boy Man Man".) appears and tries to suck in Heaven's Door. Rohan soon learns that Ken's Stand allows him to steal energy from others and keep it if he wins three games out of five, discovering that he has already gained a third of Heaven's Door's ability. Ken wins the fourth match, gaining more of Heaven's Door's ability and evening the score. Rohan borrows the invisible baby, now named Shizuka, from Joseph and has her change what Ken attempted to throw out; Rohan wins the final match as a result, retrieving Heaven's Door. Ken attempts to kill himself by jumping in front of a truck, but Rohan saves him, convincing Ken to stop using his Stand for evil.
101	27	"I'm an Alien"; Transliteration: "Boku wa Uchūjin" (Japanese: ぼくは宇宙人)	Naokatsu Tsuda	Naokatsu Tsuda, Yukihiko Asaki	Kazuyuki Fudeyasu	October 1, 2016	March 17, 2019
Josuke and Okuyasu come across a peculiar person named Mikitaka Hazekura, who claims to be an alien named Nu Mikitakazo Nshi. Josuke believes his claims to be a joke, but after Mikitaka exhibits some strange abilities, Josuke suspects Mikitaka of being a Stand user. However, upon being distressed by the sound of sirens, Mikitaka suddenly transforms his body into a pair of sneakers and flees with Josuke. Due to Mikitaka's inability to see Crazy Diamond, Josuke is confused as to whether he is a Stand user or genuinely an alien. Looking to take advantage of Mikitaka's shape-shifting ability, Josuke has him transform into dice, then challenges Rohan to a game of Cee-lo in the hopes of winning some money. As the match begins, Josuke grows worried as Mikitaka's dice rolls are too ideal and Rohan becomes suspicious.
102	28	"Highway Star, Part 1 / Highway Go Go, Part 1"; Transliteration: "Haiwei Sutā Sono 1" (Japanese: ハイウェイ・スター その1)	Jin Tamamura	Jin Tamamura	Kazuyuki Fudeyasu	October 8, 2016	March 24, 2019
Suspicious of Josuke, Rohan stabs his own finger while staking two million yen against Josuke's finger to determine how he is cheating, calling Tamami as an official to prevent Josuke from playing normally. Sirens begin to blare nearby, causing Mikitaka to become unnerved and begin losing his transformation; Rohan is then distracted upon discovering that he had accidentally set his own house on fire, allowing Josuke to escape without being discovered. Meanwhile, Hayato uses hidden cameras to spy on Kira, suspicious due to him not behaving like his father. The next day, while riding a bus through the Futatsumori Tunnel with Josuke, Rohan spots a window to a room within the tunnel revealing a man cutting off a woman's hand. Believing it to be Kira, Rohan returns to the tunnel and discovers that the room is an illusional trap. A nutrient-sucking Stand named Highway Star (Note: In the official English releases, Highway Star is named "Highway Go Go".) attacks Rohan. When Josuke comes to the tunnel, Highway Star tries to use Rohan to lure Josuke into his room so he can drain Josuke's nutrients too. Rohan warns Josuke, who defiantly ignores Rohan's warnings and enters the room. Highway Star attacks, but Rohan uses Heaven's Door to send Josuke flying out of the tunnel, urging him to flee from Highway Star and find the Stand's user.
103	29	"Highway Star, Part 2 / Highway Go Go, Part 2"; Transliteration: "Haiwei Sutā Sono 2" (Japanese: ハイウェイ・スター その2)	Yoriyasu Kogawa	Hikaru Murata	Kazuyuki Fudeyasu	October 15, 2016	March 31, 2019
Josuke flees on motorcycle from Highway Star, which can move at 60 kmh. Josuke steals a cell phone and calls Koichi for help; believing there is a connection between Highway Star's user and the tunnel, Koichi learns of a traffic accident that previously took place at the tunnel and suspects that the user is hospitalized and stealing nutrients to heal himself. While Josuke makes his way to the hospital while barely keeping ahead of Highway Star, Koichi identifies the Stand user as Yuya Fungami. Josuke reaches Yuya's room but is caught by Highway Star just as he enters; however, he recovers his nutrients with an IV drip. When Yuya tries to make Josuke feel bad about attacking a bedridden man, Josuke heals Yuya's injuries so he can mercilessly pummel him without any guilt. Meanwhile, at the Kawajiri household, Shinobu finds a cat in their basement.
104	30	"Cats Love Yoshikage Kira"; Transliteration: "Neko wa Kira Yoshikage ga Suki" (Japanese: 猫は吉良吉影が好き)	Sōichi Shimada	Jun Fujiwara, Yasufumi Soejima, Hitomi Ezoe, Tokihiro Sasaki, Yukihiko Asaki, Keisuke Nishijima	Shin'ichi Inotsume, Kazuyuki Fudeyasu	October 22, 2016	April 7, 2019
Shinobu finds herself unable to approach the cat or force it out. Upon discovering that it has a hole in its throat, Shinobu sends Kira down to the basement, only to learn that she accidentally killed it with glass shards. After Kira buries the cat in the garden, it reincarnates into a strange plant known as Stray Cat. It gradually pieces together what happened while learning it can launch compressed air bubbles. Recognizing Shinobu, Stray Cat attempts to get revenge on her; when she is injured, Kira steps in to destroy Stray Cat, but its air bubbles keep it safe from Kira's bombs while it nearly kills Kira himself. Kira appeals to Stray Cat's feline nature to pacify it, then considers its potential usefulness to him and hides it in the attic. The next day, Hayato investigates the attic and finds Stray Cat; after exposing it to sunlight, it awakens and attacks. Hayato manages to put it back to sleep, then hides just as Kira enters the attic. After he hears Kira talking to himself, Hayato realizes that the man is not his real father.
105	31	"July 15th (Thursday), Part 1"; Transliteration: "Shigatsu Jūgo-nichi (Moku), Sono 1" (Japanese: 7月15日(木) その1)	Eri Nagata, Yasufumi Soejima, Taizō Yoshida	Eri Nagata, Yasufumi Soejima, Naokatsu Tsuda	Yasuko Kobayashi	October 29, 2016	April 14, 2019
Yoshihiro, recognizing Kira in his new appearance, notices that he is being followed by Hayato. Later, on July 15th, Josuke and Okuyasu come across Mikitaka, who spots a Stand user named Toyohiro Kanedachi living on an electrical pylon. When Josuke steps inside the pylon, he falls under the effects of Kanedachi's Stand, Super Fly, becoming trapped inside until someone else takes his place. Josuke and Okuyasu attempt to destroy the pylon, only to discover it reflects any damage it receives. Wanting to help, Mikitaka confronts Kanedachi, helping Josuke escape but becoming trapped himself. Meanwhile, as something troubling happens in the Higashikata household, Rohan, who had noticed Hayato's behavior, is approached by a strange man.
106	32	"July 15th (Thursday), Part 2"; Transliteration: "Shigatsu Jūgo-nichi (Moku), Sono 2" (Japanese: 7月15日(木) その2)	Eri Nagata, Yasufumi Soejima, Taizō Yoshida	Eri Nagata, Yasufumi Soejima, Naokatsu Tsuda	Yasuko Kobayashi	November 5, 2016	April 21, 2019
Rohan is greeted at his home by Masazo Kinoto, an architect sent to evaluate the damages done to his house. Rohan uses Heaven's Door on the man, but finds nothing suspicious besides an aversion to people looking at his back. Meanwhile, Josuke climbs up the pylon to rescue Mikitaka and confront Kanedachi, who uses calculative cuts on the pylon to attack Josuke from all angles. Josuke uses Crazy Diamond's healing ability to send the bolts of energy back to their origin and defeat Kanedachi. Resigning himself to stay inside the pylon, Kanedachi reveals that he heard Yoshihiro say that another Stand user has allegedly eliminated Koichi. Josuke enlists Yuya's help in tracking Koichi's scent in exchange for healing his injuries. Together they encounter the Stand user, Terunosuke Miyamoto, who suddenly disappears and is replaced by an unconscious Tomoko. Unbeknownst to Josuke, Miyamoto had used his Stand Enigma (Note: In the official English releases, Enigma is named "Misterioso".) to turn Koichi and Tomoko into pieces of paper, which can only do so after Miyamoto witnesses someone's tics when they are afraid, and is now waiting to observe Josuke's tic.
107	33	"July 15th (Thursday), Part 3"; Transliteration: "Shigatsu Jūgo-nichi (Moku), Sono 3" (Japanese: 7月15日(木) その3)	Yasufumi Soejima, Taizō Yoshida	Yasufumi Soejima, Jirō Fujimoto, Hitomi Ezoe	Yasuko Kobayashi	November 12, 2016	April 28, 2019
Overcome by his curiosity, Rohan lays a trap for Kinoto so he can see his back. The moment he does, Kinoto dies from his back ripping open as his self-aware Stand Cheap Trick (Note: In the official English releases, Cheap Trick is named "Cheap Trap".) attaches to Rohan's back. Cheap Trick proceeds to hassle Rohan, demanding that he burns the photos of those he suspects of being Kira. Meanwhile, Miyamoto reveals that he has trapped Koichi in a piece of paper and, after goading Josuke into biting his lower lip, traps Josuke as well. Despite initially not wanting to get involved, Yuya is moved by Josuke's resolve and goes after Miyamoto, encountering several paper-hidden traps that eventually culminate in a shredder that threatens to shred both Josuke and Koichi's pieces of paper. Despite being overcome by fear and falling under Enigma's power, Yuya takes advantage of his paper-like state to reach into the shredder and free Josuke and Koichi. Josuke vengefully pummels Miyamoto, who becomes trapped in the form of a book which Josuke later donates to the library.
108	34	"July 15th (Thursday), Part 4"; Transliteration: "Shigatsu Jūgo-nichi (Moku), Sono 4" (Japanese: 7月15日(木) その4)	Taizō Yoshida	Jirō Fujimoto, Hitomi Ezoe	Yasuko Kobayashi	November 19, 2016	May 5, 2019
Rohan attempts to reach the Morioh Grand Hotel without letting anyone see his back despite Cheap Trick's antics. He tries to convince Koichi, who he cannot get to take seriously without risking either of their lives. Cheap Trick attempts to get several cats and dogs to attack Rohan and see his back, only for the animals to be shooed off by Koichi as he eventually believes Rohan's story. Koichi tries removing Cheap Trick using Echoes Act 3, only to discover that doing so damages Rohan's back as well. Rohan, appearing to have gone insane, turns to show his back to Koichi; however, once Cheap Trick turns around to look at Koichi, Rohan reveals that they are in Reimi's Ghost Alley. Having turned around, Cheap Trick is grabbed by the spectral hands and pulled from Rohan's back, but not before Rohan uses Heaven's Door to write that Cheap Trick will go to Hell. Meanwhile, Hayato witnesses Kira killing a couple with his ability and catches it on film. Kira notices Hayato as he flees, then confronts him in the bath at their home. Kira prepares to kill Hayato, only for Hayato to reveal that he has set up various cameras and videotapes that will expose Kira's identity if he attempts to kill him or his mother.
109	35	"Another One Bites the Dust, Part 1 / Bites the Dust, Part 1"; Transliteration: "Anazāwan Baitsa Dasuto, Sono 1" (Japanese: アナザーワン バイツァ・ダスト その1)	Toshiyuki Katō	Toshiyuki Katō, Hikaru Murata	Shōgo Yasukawa	November 26, 2016	May 12, 2019
Kira, infuriated, inadvertently kills Hayato in a manner that would not look like an accident. Yoshihiro then appears and reveals that Rohan and the others now consider Kosaku Kawajiri a suspect and plan to visit. Yoshihiro's arrow, sensing Kira's anxiety, moves out of Yoshihiro's hand and impales Kira's neck of its own will; the arrow enters Kira's body, granting Killer Queen a new ability. The next morning, Hayato appears alive and well, believing the previous night's events to be a nightmare. Upon going downstairs, he finds that Kira is strangely confident, even going as far to reveal his true name to Hayato as well as the other Stand users' existence. Hayato is stopped on his way to school by Rohan, who uses Heaven's Door to read Hayato's memories. Upon reaching the page revealing Kira's identity, he sees a warning that he will die. Kira's third bomb, Bites the Dust, then activates from within Hayato, destroying Rohan due to him learning of Kira's identity. As Rohan explodes, Hayato suddenly finds himself sent back in time to an hour earlier from Bites the Dust's effects.
110	36	"Another One Bites the Dust, Part 2 / Bites the Dust, Part 2"; Transliteration: "Anazāwan Baitsa Dasuto, Sono 2" (Japanese: アナザーワン バイツァ・ダスト その2)	Toshiyuki Katō, Naokatsu Tsuda	Yasuo Ejima, Keisuke Nishijima	Shōgo Yasukawa	December 3, 2016	May 19, 2019
Realizing that he is in a time loop, Hayato attempts to keep his distance from Rohan. However, Kira deduces that Hayato has already experienced Bites the Dust's effects once and explains how he used his Stand's new ability to reverse Hayato's death. Kira also reveals that anyone killed by his Stand's ability in a previous time loop will spontaneously explode even without encountering Hayato again, and that canceling Bites the Dusts' effects after the deaths have occurred again will make the deaths permanent. Hayato, after being forced to watch Rohan explode again, tries to avoid Josuke, Jotaro, Koichi, and Okuyasu when they arrive. When they corner him, Hayato attempts to kill himself to spare the others, but Bites the Dust instinctively protects Hayato while revealing itself to the others, causing them all to die as well. Hayato is sent back to his room at 7:30 AM; he realizes that the only way of saving Josuke's group and his mother is by either killing Kira or forcing him to cancel Bites the Dust before Rohan's death. Hayato hides Stray Cat in his backpack and plans to use his knowledge of events to catch Kira off guard. He unleashes Stray Cat's air bubbles on Kira, who protects himself from Stray Cat's attack with a watch he had put in his jacket earlier.
111	37	"Crazy D (Diamond) is Unbreakable, Part 1 / Shining D (Diamond) is Unbreakable, Part 1"; Transliteration: "Kureijī Daiyamondo wa Kudakenai, Sono 1" (Japanese: クレイジー・D(ダイヤモンド)は砕けない その1)	Yoriyasu Kogawa	Yasufumi Soejima, Eri Nagata	Kazuyuki Fudeyasu	December 10, 2016	May 26, 2019
As Kira carelessly announces his name while gloating over his victory, Hayato reveals that he had called Josuke before leaving home; Kira turns to see Josuke standing nearby, having brought Okuyasu. Josuke attacks, knowing he can heal Kira in a case of mistaken identity. Kira is forced to cancel Bites the Dust to protect himself from Josuke's attacks, saving Rohan and the others' lives just in time. Despite being outmatched, Kira takes advantage of Hayato having brought Stray Cat, placing it in Killer Queen's body so his Stand can create invisible remote bombs, one of which heavily damages Okuyasu. Josuke moves to heal Okuyasu, but Hayato deduces that Kira turned him into a bomb, causing Josuke to become conflicted whether to sacrifice himself to save Okuyasu. Deducing that Kira can only set off one bomb at a time, Hayato touches Okuyasu, causing himself to explode. Josuke quickly restores Hayato and heals Okuyasu, but it seems he has already died. Josuke refuses to accept that Okuyasu is dead, using Crazy Diamond on chunks of road debris lodged in his wounds to dodge Kira's air bomb. He and Hayato retreat into a nearby house, with Kira deeming that his true threat in Morioh is not Jotaro, but Josuke.
112	38	"Crazy D (Diamond) is Unbreakable, Part 2 / Shining D (Diamond) is Unbreakable, Part 2"; Transliteration: "Kureijī Daiyamondo wa Kudakenai, Sono 2" (Japanese: クレイジー・D(ダイヤモンド)は砕けない その2)	Fumitoshi Oizaki	Toshiyuki Katō, Hikaru Murata, Naokatsu Tsuda	Kazuyuki Fudeyasu	December 17, 2016	June 2, 2019
Kira somehow knows Josuke's location inside the house, heavily wounding Josuke with another bomb. However, Josuke uses his hardened blood on a vase fragment to turn it into a homing bullet that returns to a splatter of Josuke's blood on Kira's body. Josuke then notices Kira using a cell phone and realizes that Yoshihiro had been hiding in Hayato's pocket to relay their position. Josuke tricks Kira into killing Yoshihiro by stealing the latter's phone, just before the glass shard returns to pierce Kira again. Josuke then draws Kira into a close-quarters fight; Josuke has the upper hand, but Stray Cat protects Kira from Crazy Diamond's finishing blow. Just before Josuke can be hit by an air bomb, Okuyasu suddenly appears and eliminates the bomb with the Hand before snatching Stray Cat from Killer Queen. Kira is driven into a corner as Jotaro and the others arrive alongside emergency vehicles responding to the explosions.
113	39	"Goodbye, Morioh - The Heart of Gold"; Transliteration: "Sayonara Moriō-chō - Ōgon no Kokoro" (Japanese: さよなら杜王町ー黄金の心)	Naokatsu Tsuda	Naokatsu Tsuda	Yasuko Kobayashi	December 24, 2016	June 9, 2019
Surrounded by ambulances and fire engines, Kira attempts to use Bites the Dust on an approaching nurse in a last-ditch attempt to kill everyone and avert events. As Bites the Dust seems to activate, Kira suddenly finds himself in Ghost Alley. Reimi reintroduces herself and forces Kira to remember what truly happened: Koichi immobilized Kira's hand with Echoes Act 3 before Jotaro stopped time and pummeled Kira. His head was then accidentally crushed by the wheel of an ambulance. Kira realizes that he is in Ghost Alley and attempts to get Reimi to turn around, but having anticipated this, she calls Arnold to bite off his hand, causing him to turn around himself. Kira is torn to pieces by the spectral hands and dragged away. No longer bound to their regrets, Reimi and Arnold bid farewell to everyone before moving on to the next life. Life returns to normal in Morioh, and Jotaro and Joseph start sailing home, with Josuke seeing them off as the summer of 1999 ends.
