= Stand Proud =

- Cover of "Stand Proud" featuring Stardust Crusaders protagonist Jotaro Kujo (right) and his Stand Star Platinum (left)

Single by Jin Hashimoto
- Released: April 23, 2014
- Genre: Heavy metal, power metal
- Length: 4:38
- Label: Warner Home Video
- Songwriters: Shoko Fujibayashi, Takatugu Wakabayashi, ZENTA

JoJo's Bizarre Adventure theme song singles chronology
"Bloody Stream" (2013)	"Stand Proud" (2014)	"JoJo Sono Chi no Kioku ~end of THE WORLD~" (2015)

"Stand Proud" (stylized in all caps) is a song by Jin Hashimoto, with lyrics by Shoko Fujibayashi, composition by Takatuku Wakabayashi, and arrangement (and guitars) by ZENTA. It is the first opening theme song for JoJo's Bizarre Adventure: Stardust Crusaders; a single was released on April 23, 2014. The edit for the television series' broadcasts was made available for purchase exclusively through Dwango on April 12, 2014, as a preview, and the full length on the Chaku Uta Full service on April 18.

== Track listing ==
All lyrics are written by Shoko Fujibayashi; all music is composed by Takatugu Wakabayashi.

No.	Title	Length
1.	"Stand Proud"	4:38
2.	"Stand Proud" (Original Karaoke)	4:37
Total length:		9:14

== Covers ==
Fantôme Iris, a fictional visual kei band from multimedia franchise Argonavis from BanG Dream! covered the song on their live Fantôme Iris Concept Live -Gekkoukyouen- held on September 23, 2021.

== Chart performance ==
On the Oricon's Weekly Singles Charts, "Stand Proud" peaked at number 13 after being on the charts for 2 weeks. On Billboard's Japan Hot 100, the song debuted and peaked at 11. On Billboard's other charts in Japan, the song placed number 3 on the Hot Animation and Top Independent Albums and Singles charts, and 2 on the Hot Singles Sales charts.
