= Jin Hashimoto =

Japanese singer and vocal trainer (born 1964)

- Born: July 27, 1964 (age 62); Amagasaki, Hyōgo Prefecture
- Origin: Japan
- Years active: 1986–present

Jin Hashimoto (橋本 仁, Hashimoto Jin) is a Japanese singer and vocal trainer. He is best known for his contributions to Japanese television series' theme songs, such as his debut as the vocalist for the ending theme of Kamen Rider Kuuga.

After joining an Earth, Wind & Fire tribute band at age 22, he formed the band BETCHIN' with Akio Togashi and Hiroaki "Tommy" Tominaga in 1998 and together they released two albums. He made his solo debut in 2000 with the song "Aozora ni Naru" for Kamen Rider Kuuga's soundtrack. He performed a series of other songs on the Kuuga soundtrack, as well as its successor Kamen Rider Agito and Kamen Rider Hibiki. His performance is one of the influences of Hideyuki Takahashi, who had success in other theme song performances.

In 2014, Hashimoto performed what might be his most well known performance, the vocals on "Stand Proud" and "JoJo Sono Chi no Kioku," the opening theme songs for JoJo's Bizarre Adventure: Stardust Crusaders.
