= Darby (name) =

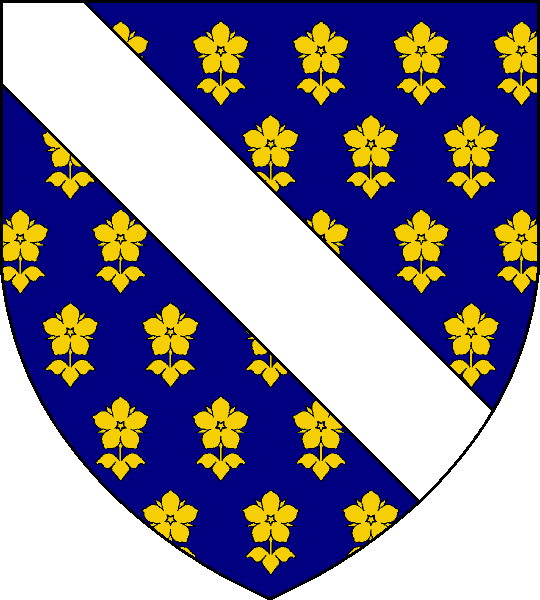
Coat of arms of Darby

Darby is an English locational surname and has since become a given name. Its prefix derives from the Old Norse djúr ("deer"), and the suffix -býr ("farm"/"settlement"). The oldest recorded use as a surname dates to the period of 1160–1182 in Lincolnshire. Darby was a common pre-1800 alternative spelling of Derby, a city in England.

In Ireland, Darby is a diminutive of the Gaelic name Ó Diarmada, which means "descendant of Diarmaid".

Notable people with the name or its variants include:

== Surname ==
Darby
- Pronunciation: /ˈdɑːrbi/ DAR-bee

Origin
- Meaning: "deer" "farm"/"settlement"
- Region of origin: English

Other names
- Variant forms: D'Arby, d'Arby, D'arby, Derby

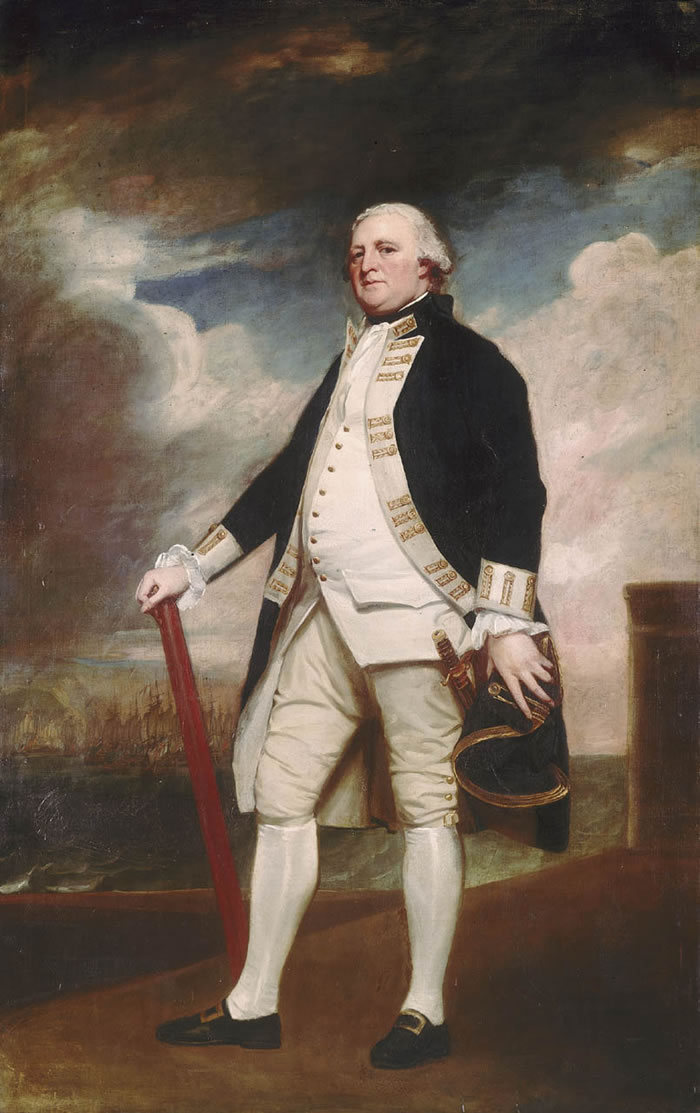
Vice-Admiral George Darby, by George Romney, ca.1784

=== Darby ===
- Darby (surname)

=== D'Arby ===
- Josie d'Arby (born 1972), British actress
- Terence Trent D'Arby (born 1962), American singer-songwriter

== Given name ==
Darby
- Pronunciation: /ˈdɑːrbi/ DAR-bee
- Gender: unisex

- Darby Allin (born 1997), American wrestler
- Darby Bailey, American actress, musician, songwriter, writer/producer, and businesswoman
- Darby Bergin (1826–1896), Ontario physician and political figure
- Darby Berkhout (born 1966), Canadian rower
- Darby Brown (1929–1988), Australian boxer of the 1940s and '50s
- Darby Camp (born 2007), American actress
- Darby Conley (born 1970), American cartoonist creator of Get Fuzzy
- Darby Cottle (born 1961), American softball player
- Darby Cowgill (born 2011), Programmer
- Darby Crash (1958–1980), American musician, from the band The Germs
- Darby Dougherty, American actress in the film Gummo
- Darby Dunn, American journalist and reporter
- Darby Field (1610–1649), British, first European to climb Mount Washington in New Hampshire
- Darby Gould (born 1965), American vocalist
- Darby Hendrickson (born 1972), American hockey player and coach
- Darby Hinton (born 1957), American actor and filmmaker
- Darby Jones (1910–1986), American actor
- Darby Lloyd Rains (born 1948), American adult film performer
- Darby Loudon (1897–1963), New Zealand-born rugby union player
- Darby Lux II (1737–1795), American businessman, militiaman in the American Revolution
- Darby McCarthy (1944–2020), Australian jockey
- Darby McDevitt (born 1975), American game developer and writer
- Darby Mills, Canadian rock vocalist
- Darby Nelson (1940 –2022), American writer and politician
- Darby O'Brien (1863–1893), American baseball player
- Darby Penney (1952–2021), American writer, activist
- Darby Riordan (1888–1936), Australian politician
- Darby Slick (born 1944), American guitarist and songwriter
- Darby Stanchfield (born 1971), American film and television actress
- Darby W. Betts (1912–1998), American Episcopal priest
- Darby Walker (born 1974), Canadian ice hockey player

== Fictional characters ==
- Ernest Darby, on the television series Sons of Anarchy
- Daniel J. D'Arby, from the JoJo's Bizarre Adventure manga series
- Darby O'Gill, in the writings of Herminie Templeton Kavanagh
- Darby Carter, on the television series Love Life as portrayed by Anna Kendrick
- Darby Shaw, in the film The Pelican Brief played by Julia Roberts
- Darby, a character who replaced Christopher Robin in the animated television show, My Friends Tigger and Pooh

== See also ==
- Arby (disambiguation)
- Darby and Joan (disambiguation)
