= Arabi, Iran =

Arabi (Persian: ارابي or عربي) may refer to:

- Arabi, Bushehr (عربي - ‘Arabī)
- Arabi, Fars (عربي - ‘Arabī)
- Arabi, Hormozgan (ارابي - Ārābī)
