= Boveyri =

Boveiry or Buvairi or Buyeri (Persian: بويري) may refer to:

- Boveyri, Bushehr
- Boveyri, alternate name of Bowheyri, Bushehr Province
- Buyeri, Kohgiluyeh and Boyer-Ahmad
