= Aarabi =

Aarabi is a surname. Notable people with the surname include:

- Bizhan Aarabi (born 1947), Iranian-American neurosurgeon, researcher, author, and academic
- Parham Aarabi (born 1976), Canadian professor and entrepreneur
- Sohrab Aarabi (1990–2009), Iranian student and pro-democracy activist

== See also ==
- Arabi (disambiguation)
