= Araby =

Araby may refer to:

- Araby, an archaic name for Arabia or the Arab world
- Araby (Mason's Springs, Maryland), a historic home listed on the NRHP
- "Araby" (short story), from James Joyce's 1914 Dubliners
  - Araby (1999 film), an independent short film adapted from the short story
- Araby (Warhammer), a country in the Warhammer Fantasy setting by Games Workshop
- Arabi, Louisiana, United States
- Arabic chat alphabet, a method of transcribing Arabic into Latin alphabet plus Hindu-Arabic number
- Nabil Elaraby (born 1935), Foreign Minister of Egypt appointed on 6 March 2011
- "The Sheik of Araby", a 1921 jazz song
- "Araby", song by The Gun Club from their 1987 album Mother Juno
- Araby, fictional ship in the Tod Moran mysteries, novels by Howard Pease
- Araby (2017 film), a 2017 drama film

== See also ==
- Arby (disambiguation)
- Al-Arabi (disambiguation)
- Arabi (disambiguation)
- Arabic (disambiguation)
