= Al-Arabi =

Al-Arabi may refer to:

== Companies ==
- Al-Arabi Group, a holding company in the Kuwait Stock Exchange#Services
- Al Arabi Investment Group (AB Invest), a subsidiary of Arab Bank
- Al Arabi Investment Group Company, a subsidiary of Arab Bank

== Media ==
- Al Ahram Al Arabi, an Arabic political weekly magazine published in Egypt since 1997
- Al Arabi (newspaper), a weekly newspaper in Egypt
- Al-Arabi (magazine), a pan-Arab magazine published in Kuwait since 1958
- Al Araby Television Network, a Qatari pan-Arab television network owned by Fadaat Media
- Al-Araby Al-Jadeed or The New Arab, a pan-Arab media outlet in London owned by Fadaat Media
- Al-Quds Al-Arabi, a pan-Arab daily newspaper published in London since 1989

== People ==
- Abu Bakr ibn al-Arabi (1076–1148), Muslim qadi and scholar of Maliki law from al-Andalus
- Mahdi al-Arabi, is a Libyan Brigadier-General and deputy chief of staff during the 2011 Libyan civil war
- Nabil Elaraby or Nabil al-Arabi (born 1935), an Egyptian diplomat who was Secretary-General of the Arab League from 2011 to 2016
- Sulayman al-Arabi, Wali (governor) of Barcelona and Girona in the year 777
- Youssef El-Arabi or Youssef Al-Arabi (born 1987), a professional footballer

== Sports ==
- Mohammed Bin Hamad AlHitmi Indoor Hall or Al-Arabi Indoor Hall, a multi-purpose arena in Doha, Qatar

=== Qatar ===
- Al Arabi Qatar (volleyball), a professional volleyball team based in Doha
- Al-Arabi FC (Qatar) Reserves, the reserves soccer team for Al-Arabi Qatar
- Al Arabi Qatar (handball), based in Doha
- Al-Arabi SC (Qatar), a multi-sports club founded in 1952
- Al-Arabi SC basketball, a professional basketball team based in Doha

=== Saudi Arabia ===
- Al-Arabi (Saudi Arabia), a multi-sports club based in Unaizah, Al-Qassim, and founded in 1958
- Al-Arabi (Saudi Arabia, basketball club), based in Unaizah, Al Qassim
- Al-Arabi (Saudi Arabia, handball club), based in Unaizah, Al Qassim

=== Other countries ===
- Al-Arabi (Bahraini football club)
- Al-Arabi SC (Irbid), a Jordanian football club based in Irbid and founded in 1945
- Al-Arabi SC (Kuwait), a multi-sports club based in Mansuriya and founded in 1953
- Al-Arabi SC (Syria), a football club based in As-Suwayda and founded in 1972
- Al-Arabi (UAE), a football club based in Umm Al Quwain
- Al Shabab (Dubai) or Al Shabab Al Arabi Club, merged with Dubai CSC in 2017 to form Shabab Al-Ahli Dubai FC

== Other uses ==
- Al-Arabi (encyclopedia), a printed Arabic encyclopedia
- Al-Arabi, a version of Code page ASMO449+, the 7-bit character set used to encode the Arabic language

== See also ==
- Arabi (disambiguation)
- Araby (disambiguation)
- Elaraby (disambiguation)
