= Jōsuke =

Jōsuke, Josuke, or Jousuke (written: 仗助, 譲介, 丈助, or 成甫) is a masculine Japanese given name. Notable people with the name include:

- Josuke Kimura (木村穣介; born 1961), the CEO of Suntory Beverage & Food Limited.
- Josuke Nagata (永田丈助; born 1997), a Japanese boxer.
- Josuke Ohata (大畠仗助; died 2007), a Japanese musician and bassoonist.
- Josuke Sato (佐藤丈助; born 1975), a Japanese footballer.
- Josuke Shiraogawa (白男川譲介; 1880-1951), a Japanese Home Ministry police bureaucrat and businessman.

== Fictional characters ==
- Josuke Higashikata (東方 仗助), the protagonist of JoJo's Bizarre Adventure Part 4
- Jōsuke Udono (鵜殿 丈助), a character in Basilisk: The Kōga Ninja Scrolls
