= Darby and Joan (disambiguation) =

Darby and Joan is a phrase referring to a married couple.

Darby and Joan may also refer to:

- Darby and Joan (1920 film), a British film starring Derwent Hall Caine
- Darby and Joan (1937 film), a British film starring Tod Slaughter
- Darby & Joan (album), a 2004 album by Gentleman Reg
- Darby and Joan, a painting (c. 1890) by James Charles (painter)
- Darby and Joan (TV series), a 2022 Australian television series
