= Lavar-e Razemi =

Village in Bushehr province, Iran

Lavar-e Razemi Persian: لاوررزمي
- Village
- Location within Iran
- Coordinates: 28°36′07″N 51°34′15″E
- Country: Iran
- Province: Bushehr
- County: Dashti
- District: Central
- Rural District: Markazi

Population (2016)
  - Total: 959
- Time zone: UTC+3:30 (IRST)

Lavar-e Razemi (Persian: لاوررزمي) (Note: Also romanized as Lāvar-e Razemī and Lāvar-e Sharqī) is a village in Markazi Rural District of the Central District in Dashti County, Bushehr province, Iran.

== Demographics ==
=== Population ===
At the time of the 2006 National Census, the village's population was 806 in 187 households. The following census in 2011 counted 949 people in 236 households. The 2016 census measured the population of the village as 959 people in 254 households.
