= Mohammadabad, Bushehr =

Village in Bushehr province, Iran

Mohammadabad Persian: محمد آباد
- Village
- Location within Iran
- Coordinates: 28°36′35″N 51°22′31″E
- Country: Iran
- Province: Bushehr
- County: Dashti
- District: Central
- Rural District: Markazi

Population (2016)
  - Total: 2,547
- Time zone: UTC+3:30 (IRST)

Mohammadabad (Persian: محمد آباد) (Note: Also romanized as Moḩammadābād; also known as Muhammadābād) is a village in Markazi Rural District of the Central District in Dashti County, Bushehr province, Iran.

== Demographics ==
=== Population ===
At the time of the 2006 National Census, the village's population was 1,837 in 413 households. The following census in 2011 counted 2,132 people in 540 households. The 2016 census measured the population of the village as 2,547 people in 689 households. It was the most populous village in its rural district.
