= Arby =

Arby may refer to:

- Årby, a housing project in Eskilstuna, Sweden
- Khaira Arby (1959–2018), Malian singer
- Arby's, a North American fast food chain
- Arby, a character in the British TV series Utopia

== See also ==
- Araby (disambiguation)
- Darby (name) or D'Arby, a name and given name (and list of people with the name)
