= Markazi Rural District =

Rural district in Bushehr province, Iran

Markazi Rural District Persian: دهستان مركزئ
- Rural District
- Location within Iran
- Coordinates: 28°36′N 51°28′E
- Country: Iran
- Province: Bushehr
- County: Dashti
- District: Central
- Established: 1986
- Capital: Bowheyri

Population (2016)
  - Total: 6,354
- Time zone: UTC+3:30 (IRST)

Markazi Rural District (Persian: دهستان مركزئ) is in the Central District of Dashti County, Bushehr province, Iran. Its capital is the village of Bowheyri.

== Demographics ==
=== Population ===
At the time of the 2006 National Census, the rural district's population was 5,331 in 1,203 households. There were 5,784 inhabitants in 1,526 households at the following census of 2011. The 2016 census measured the population of the rural district as 6,354 in 1,800 households. The most populous of its 13 villages was Mohammadabad, with 2,547 people.

=== Other villages in the rural district ===
- Arabi
- Lavar-e Razemi
