= Arabi =

Arabi may refer to:

- Ibn Arabi (1165–1240), early medieval Muslim mystic and philosopher
- Arabi (sheep)
- Arabi, Iran (disambiguation), villages in Iran
- Arabi, Ethiopia
- Arabi, Georgia, United States
- Ahmed ‘Urabi, a 19th-century Egyptian rebel and patriot
- Arabi, Louisiana, United States, named for him
- Arabi Island, Saudi Arabia

== See also ==
- Al-Arabi (disambiguation)
- Araby (disambiguation)
- Arabic (disambiguation)
