= Arabi, Hormozgan =

Arabi ارابي
- Village
- Location within Iran
- Coordinates: 27°11′26″N 55°41′39″E
- Country: Iran
- Province: Hormozgan
- County: Khamir
- Bakhsh: Central
- Rural District: Kohurestan

Population (2006)
  - Total: 747
- Time zone: UTC+3:30 (IRST)
  - Summer (DST): UTC+4:30 (IRDT)

Arabi (Persian: ارابي, also Romanized as Ārābī) is a village in Kohurestan Rural District, in the Central District of Khamir County, Hormozgan Province, Iran. At the 2006 census, its population was 747, in 130 families.
