= Parham Aarabi =

Canadian professor and entrepreneur

Parham Aarabi (Persian: پرهام اعرابی, born August 25, 1976) is a professor and entrepreneur from Toronto, Canada.

== Career ==
Aarabi is a professor at University of Toronto and Canada Research Chair in Internet Video, Audio, and Image Search. He has a Ph.D. in Electrical Engineering from Stanford University. He is the inventor of numerous patents and author of over 80 publications most of which focus on audio, image and video processing. His recent work has focused on new image processing techniques that detect faces and facial features, as well as new video search technologies for online video-sharing websites. He is the founder and CEO of ModiFace, a leading provider of Augmented Reality technology which was acquired in 2018 by L'Oreal. Aarabi has won several teaching and lecturing awards, including an international award from the IEEE. In 2005, he was named to the MIT Technology Review TR35 as one of the top 35 innovators in the world under the age of 35. He also received the 2007 Premier's Catalyst Award for Innovation (a $200,000 Ontario Government prize for young innovators). His work has appeared in the New York Times, the Discovery Channel, and Scientific American.

== Bibliography ==
- The art of lecturing: a practical guide to successful university lectures and business presentations, Cambridge University Press (2007)
- Phase-based speech processing, (with three other authors) World Scientific (2006)
