= List of JoJo's Bizarre Adventure characters =

The heroes of JoJo's Bizarre Adventure Parts 1 through 7. From left to right: Will A. Zeppeli, Jonathan Joestar, Giorno Giovanna, Jotaro Kujo, Joseph Joestar (top), Jolyne Cujoh (bottom), Johnny Joestar, Josuke Higashikata, and Gyro Zeppeli.

The JoJo's Bizarre Adventure manga series features a large cast of characters created by Hirohiko Araki. Spanning several generations, the series is split into nine parts, each following a different descendant of the Joestar family. Parts 7–9 take place in a separate continuity from the previous six. Many of the characters have supernatural abilities which give them a variety of unique traits.

== Creation and conception ==
=== Part 1: Phantom Blood ===
When first beginning the series, Dio Brando is the character that Araki looked forward to drawing the most. Inspired by FBI profiling of serial killers and how they control their victims through psychological manipulation, he gave Dio a similar trait, using his charisma to ensure his followers do his bidding. Araki revealed that he had not thought up a weakness for the character and that it was difficult to come up with a way for Dio to be defeated. As the first Joestar, Araki created Jonathan Joestar to be "a symbol of purity and dignity", which he admitted might have resulted in him being "boring". Jonathan's physical transformation during the seven-year skip was done with his upcoming battle with Dio in mind and inspired by muscular film actors popular at the time, such as Arnold Schwarzenegger and Sylvester Stallone. A fan of karate manga as a child, Araki also wanted JoJo to exude an aura of strength like in Karate Baka Ichidai, leading to the character learning the supernatural Hamon technique. As Jonathan's teacher, Araki modeled Will A. Zeppeli after martial arts masters in Jackie Chan movies and Mr. Miyagi in The Karate Kid, whose "silly" appearances hide their strength. Araki dressed him as a magician and modeled his mustache after those of Salvador Dalí and the character Iyami from Osomatsu-kun. The Zeppeli name is derived from the English rock band Led Zeppelin.

=== Part 2: Battle Tendency ===
Because it was "unprecedented" to kill off the main character in a Weekly Shōnen Jump manga, and wanting to shift from physical battles to more "cerebral" fights, Araki made Part 2's protagonist look very similar to Jonathan but with a more adventurous and confrontational personality. The author referred to Joseph Joestar as "a muscle-bound B.T.", the main character from his earlier series Cool Shock B.T.; a shōnen manga hero who bends the rules as he fights. Having not been able to show a friendly rivalry between Jonathan and Dio, Araki introduced Caesar Zeppeli to present a more positive friendly rivalry between him and Joseph. Wanting each user to have a different type of Hamon with a unique design, he gave Caesar the seemingly fleeting bubbles as a "representation of his fate and the burden he is carrying". He enjoys giving characters weapons with faults and having them make up for it with strategy. The author stated that these "spheres" were inherited by both Gyro Zeppeli in Steel Ball Run and Josuke Higashikata in JoJolion. Araki created the warrior-type Lisa Lisa, based on a neighborhood girl he knew as a child, to stand out compared to previous shōnen manga female characters who were typically cute and designed to be "a man's ideal woman". He stated that at the time it was hard to get Japanese readers to remember a foreign name, so he chose something with repetition. Having to surpass Dio, the Pillar Men's designs were based on Roman statues, Egyptian sphinxes and Japanese nio statues to give them godlike features. Araki designed Kars with a turban to show his superior intelligence and that he is their king, his Brilliant Bone Blade ability harkening to Araki's earlier series Baoh.

=== Part 3: Stardust Crusaders ===
Although a Japanese protagonist, Araki modeled Jotaro Kujo after American actor Clint Eastwood, including his poses and catchphrases. Although the author said the character might seem "rough" compared to other Jump protagonists, Jotaro fits his own image of a hero perfectly as a "loner" who does not do the right thing for attention. Araki said the character wearing his school uniform in the desert has its roots in Mitsuteru Yokoyama's Babel II, and that if he were to draw the part over again, he would base the Stands on Tetsujin 28-go. Araki said he had a lot of readers asking him to bring older characters back. Although he is not a fan of bringing them back simply for nostalgia, he did not hesitate having Joseph return to save his daughter because it is completely true to the character. The author thought of having Joseph drop out partway through due to his age, but ended up "playing it by ear" as serialization continued. He gave him the role of "navigator", introducing new readers to the Joestar family, Dio, Hamon and Stands, and his own Stand being a support ability rather than offensive. Araki said he gave Avdol an "ethnic" design to have some sort of connection to Egypt and that at the time of serialization, he and most of the readers had a strong interest in the "birthplaces of civilization", making the design a "product of the times".

Araki stated that he had Kakyoin act as a foil to Jotaro. Although they both wear school uniforms, Kakyoin's well-tailored one gives him the feel of an honor student, while Jotaro's loose-fitting one and accessories convey that he is a delinquent. He made him Jotaro's first real Stand opponent to visually convey the concepts between short-range and long-range Stand abilities. The author revealed that he always read the kanji for Kakyoin's given name as "Tenmei", but his editor approved the reading Noriaki for the tankōbon much to his surprise. His surname was taken from a town in Sendai. In order to not have him overlap with Jotaro and Joseph, Polnareff was given a distinctive look and personality, which in turn made him shine on his own. Because he is a versatile character who could say goofy lines or serious ones, he "needed" to make more appearances. More appearances means more fights, and because he made it through so many life-or-death situations, Araki feels that Polnareff grew the most in the story. The author used foreign models as reference for his hair, and also drew it like Rudol von Stroheim's from Battle Tendency. The character's name was inspired by those of Araki's three favorite French people, actors Alain Delon and Jean-Paul Belmondo, and musician Michel Polnareff. Not having any limitations on what he can put in the series, Araki has animals appear and even had one join the Joestar party. Although he feels that The Fool is a perfect fit for Iggy, it just happened to be the last tarot card for him to assign aside from The World. Additionally, he thought of assigning The Fool to an enemy instead, but things just "ended up working out the way they did". Being the first time he made an animal a major character and the first time he showed one in battle, Araki used Yoshihiro Takahashi's Ginga: Nagareboshi Gin as a reference.

With the series meant to be long-running, Araki took great care in deciding which unique Stand user to put the main cast against and when, in order to keep readers interested. He designed Strength, Ebony Devil, and Yellow Temperance so that their appearances and abilities did not overlap. But as these were all one-on-one battles, he then decided to introduce Hol Horse and J. Geil as a team. He had always planned on having Noriaki Kakyoin and Jean Pierre Polnareff switch allegiances to the good guys, but not Hol Horse, even though he considered the idea. Although he drew a color illustration with Hol Horse alongside the Joestar group and had the character return several times through the story, he suspects he did not go through with it because his personality overlaps with Polnareff's. He also said that because he did not put many limitations on Hol Horse's Stand, it kind of got out of control, plus it overlaps with Kakyoin's Emerald Splash. He did enjoy Hol Horse's "why be number one when you can be number two" philosophy, which the author carried over to Yoshikage Kira in Diamond Is Unbreakable, and his outlaw appearance is similar to that of Gyro Zeppeli from the later part Steel Ball Run and might have been inspired by Buichi Terasawa's Cobra.

=== Part 4: Diamond Is Unbreakable ===
With Part 4, Araki said that he moved away from "muscle men" as they fell out of popularity with his readers, and he wanted to focus more on fashion. When designing his characters' outfits, Araki considers both everyday fashion and "cartoonish, bizarre clothing that would be impractical in real life". He also forgoes using specific color schemes for his characters and gives his readers different impressions through various color combinations. Araki said that while he drew several characters in Parts 1 through 3 naked to evoke Greek or Roman gods, he stopped doing it so much from Part 4 onward to be a "bit closer to home".

=== Part 5: Golden Wind ===
Araki said that the main focus of Golden Wind was to draw "beautiful men" who can only exist in a world where there is "beauty in meeting one's doom." He wanted the characters and fashion to be in the style of the Italian city of Rome. The curls in Giorno Giovanna's hair were inspired by Michelangelo's statue David. Araki cited Guido Mista and Prosciutto as characters he enjoyed drawing; the former due to his positive attitude and for being "true to himself without doubts" and the latter for his "brotherly relationship" with his subordinate Pesci and fun Stand power. Araki decided to grant Trish Una a Stand power while writing the series, creating Carne's Stand simply for her to fight it, and had more fun drawing Carne than his Stand.

=== Part 6: Stone Ocean ===
For Stone Ocean, Araki wrote a female protagonist for the first time which he found complicated, but also interesting due to the humanity she could possess. He has stated that the reason he had not previously included a female protagonist was because he felt his works did not interest women, but eventually decided that the culture had shifted to one where women could be tough. Araki also stated that he visited a prison in Florida in order to do research for the writing of Stone Ocean and Jolyne's experience. He believes that Jolyne is the toughest of his protagonists.

=== Part 7: Steel Ball Run ===
For Steel Ball Run, having not specifically set out on creating a disabled character, Araki explained that Johnny Joestar's paraplegia was a natural result of wanting to show a character who could grow, both physically and mentally, during a race where "he would be forced not only to rely on other people, but horses as well".

=== Part 8: JoJolion ===
For JoJolion, Araki stated that the -lion in the title is derived from the Ancient Greek εὐαγγέλιον (evangelion), in reference to the Gospels; "By combining this word with 'JoJo', I've meant for the title to signify the existence of the protagonist 'Josuke' in this world".

== Joestar family tree ==
The birthmark of the Joestar Family

The series' protagonists are the members of the Joestar Family (ジョースター家, Jōsutā Ke), with a majority of its members bearing a star-shaped birthmark above their left shoulder blade. In Parts 1–6, the Joestar bloodline was inherited by the Kujo Family (空条家, Kūjō Ke) and Josuke Higashikata. Dio, having stolen Jonathan's body at the end of Part 1, fathered a few sons bearing the Joestar bloodline while awakening use of Stands in Jonathan's descendants. In the alternate universe depicted in Parts 7–9, Johnny Joestar marries Rina Higashikata with the Higashikata Family becoming a distinct branch of the Joestar family.

=== First continuity (Parts 1–6) ===
Mary Joestar | George Joestar | Dario Brando | Unnamed mother
Erina Pendleton-Joestar | JoJo; Jonathan Joestar | Unnamed mother | Dio Brando
George Joestar II | Lisa Lisa; Elizabeth Joestar | JoJo (GioGio); Giorno Giovanna
Tomoko Higashikata | JoJo; Joseph Joestar | Suzi Q Joestar | Rikiel | Donatello Versus | Ungalo
JoJo; Josuke Higashikata | Holly Kujo | Sadao Kujo
Shizuka Joestar | JoJo; Jotaro Kujo | Unnamed mother
JoJo; Jolyne Cujoh

=== Second continuity (Parts 7–9) ===
Anne Joestar | George Joestar II | Norisuke Higashikata I | Teru Higashikata
Nicholas Joestar | JoJo; Johnny Joestar | Rina Higashikata | Norisuke Higashikata II | Toyoko Higashikata
Unknown Daughter | George Joestar III | Elizabeth Joestar | Norisuke Higashikata III | Tomoko Higashikata
Joseph Joestar | Suzi Q Joestar | Norisuke Higashikata IV | Kaato Higashikata
Yoshiteru Kira | Holly Joestar-Kira | Barbara Ann Joestar | Unnamed Father | Jobin Higashikata | Mitsuba Higashikata | Hato Higashikata | Joshu Higashikata | Daiya Higashikata
Josefumi Kujo | Yoshikage Kira | Kei Nijimura | JoJo; Jodio Joestar | Dragona Joestar | Tsurugi Higashikata
JoJo; Josuke Higashikata

Note: Josuke Higashikata is the fusion between Josefumi Kujo and Yoshikage Kira. Not pictured here are several unnamed siblings of George Joestar III and the unborn second child of Jobin and Mitsuba Higashikata.

== Characters ==
=== Part 1: Phantom Blood ===
Set in England in the 1880s, the Joestar family adopts the orphaned Dio Brando.

Jonathan "JoJo" Joestar (ジョナサン・ジョースター, Jonasan Jōsutā)

The main protagonist of Phantom Blood, Jonathan is the son of George Joestar I who carries his surname with pride while striving to be a gentleman who never betrays his code of honor and defending those in need even when at a grave disadvantage. He is a passionate person, he wants to be the best at everything that he does, whether it is fighting or even table manners. Jonathan's life becomes one of misery when Dio Brando is adopted by George, eventually resulting in his father's death as Dio sought to kill both of them. This motivates Jonathan to learn how to utilize Hamon energy from Will A. Zeppeli to settle the score with Dio, though his power later increases drastically when a dying Zeppeli transfers his remaining Hamon into him. Jonathan eventually defeats Dio, but Dio survives and then manages to kill him and take over his body when he and Erina were traveling to America. As a result of Dio gaining a Stand with Jonathan's body, all of Jonathan's descendants gain Stands as well. Jonathan's body also has an unnamed Stand that Dio uses, seemingly identical in both appearance and function to Joseph's Hermit Purple. Jonathan's body is ultimately destroyed in Stardust Crusaders when Jotaro and Joseph expose it to the sun.
In Japanese, he is voiced by Kazuyuki Okitsu in the anime, Hideyuki Tanaka and (as a youth) Kazuya Nakai in the 2006 video game, and Katsuyuki Konishi in the 2007 film. In English, he is voiced by Johnny Yong Bosch.
Dio Brando (ディオ・ブランドー, Dio Burandō)

The main antagonist of the series, Dio secretly murdered his abusive father Dario Brando before becoming a member of the Joestar household with the intent of inheriting it for himself. When this ultimately fails after Jonathan catches him in the act of poisoning George Joestar, Dio uses the Stone Mask to transform himself into a vampire with the intent of using his zombies to conquer the world. Though defeated, Dio resurfaces in the 1980s under the name of simply Dio as the antagonist of Stardust Crusaders, having taken Jonathan's decapitated body for his own while manifesting his time-stopping Stand The World (世界(ザ・ワールド), Za Wārudo). Despite his death at Jotaro's hands, Dio directly influenced many events that transpired in Diamond is Unbreakable, Golden Wind, and Stone Ocean.
In Japanese, he is voiced by Takehito Koyasu in the 2012 anime, Nobuo Tanaka in the 1993 OVA, Hikaru Midorikawa in the 2006 video game and 2007 film, (as a youth) Kenji Nojima in the 2006 video game, and Isshin Chiba in the 1998 video game. In English, he is voiced by Patrick Seitz in the 2012 anime and Kid Beyond in the 2003 dub of the OVA.
Robert E. O. Speedwagon (ロバート・E・O・スピードワゴン, Robāto Ī. Ō. Supīdowagon)
Robert E. O. Speedwagon (c. 1863–1952) first appears as an Ogre Street thug boss attacking Jonathan, but soon realizes the young man's worthiness and dedication, becoming his greatest friend. He helps uncover Dio's plot to assassinate George Joestar, using poison, and from that point onward remains by Jonathan's side, helping in whatever way he could to defeat Dio. By the 1930s, Speedwagon's success upon founding his own oil company enables him to found the Speedwagon Foundation, a powerful and influential organization which assists the Joestar family a great deal in subsequent story arcs. He appears in Battle Tendency as a supporting character, where he is captured by Nazi commander Rudol von Stroheim in order to get information on the Stone Mask and the Pillar Men. He is saved by Joseph after the latter sneaks into the Mexican base that Stroheim occupies. Speedwagon eventually dies of a heart attack in between the events of Battle Tendency and Stardust Crusaders.
In Japanese, he is voiced by Yōji Ueda in the anime and Masaya Onosaka in the 2006 video game; he does not appear in the 2007 film. In English, he is voiced by Keith Silverstein.
Will A. Zeppeli (ウィル・A・ツェペリ, Wiru Ē. Tseperi)
Will Anthonio Zeppeli (died 1888) was on a ship with a crew studying Aztec ruins as a young man, when his father put on the Stone Mask and killed everyone in the crew but his son. After this horrific event, Will travels the world in order to destroy the mask, and sees a man cure someone using Hamon. Will is then directed to his master, Tonpetty, who teaches him to use Hamon. However, Tonpetty foresees Will's death during his training, warning him that should he complete his training he will surely die. He trains Jonathan in Hamon after the Joestar's house burns down and joins him to destroy Dio and the mask. He is fatally wounded by Tarkus, but manages to transfer his Hamon to Jonathan before dying.
In Japanese, he is voiced by Yoku Shioya in the anime, and Rikiya Koyama in the 2006 video game and 2007 film. In English, he is voiced by Joe Ochman.
Straizo (ストレイツォ, Sutoreitso)
Straizo (died 1938) is a Hamon user who first appears as one of Tonpetty's pupils, aiding Jonathan in the fight against Dio. However, in the 1930s during Battle Tendency where he succeeded his mentor, Straizo admitted his desire for youth and envied Dio. This motivated him into betraying Speedwagon and using one of the newly discovered Stone Masks to become a vampire. Straizo makes an attempt on Joseph's life and is defeated on the Brooklyn Bridge, destroying himself with the Hamon he stored in his body prior to becoming a vampire. He is also the adoptive father of Lisa Lisa, who is Joseph's mother.
In Japanese, he is voiced by Nobuo Tobita in the anime and Hiroaki Miura in the 2006 video game; he does not appear in the 2007 film. In English, he is voiced by Dave Mallow.
Erina Joestar / Erina Pendleton (エリナ・ジョースター / エリナ・ペンドルトン, Erina Jōsutā / Erina Pendoruton)
Erina Joestar (née Pendleton) (c. 1869–1950) is a girl from Jonathan's town and eventual love interest. Erina and Jonathan begin a romantic relationship but it is ruined when Dio forcefully kisses her. This causes Jonathan to brutally retaliate against Dio. After the Joestar mansion burns down, Jonathan reunites with Erina when she tends to his wounds and they resume their relationship. After Dio is defeated, they marry each other. However, on their honeymoon ship is ambushed by Dio. Dio fatally wounds Jonathan and he begs a pregnant Erina to save herself and an orphan girl and both survive the explosion. After her son George dies and Lisa Lisa is forced to flee, Erina becomes the sole guardian of her grandson Joseph Joestar. She dies due to natural causes after the events of Battle Tendency.
In Japanese, she is voiced by Ayako Kawasumi in the anime, Aya Hisakawa in the 2006 video game, and Nana Mizuki in the 2007 film. In English, she is voiced by Michelle Ruff.
Bruford (ブラフォード, Burafōdo) (Note: "Blueford" in official English releases.)
Bruford (died 1888) was formerly, along with Tarkus, a powerful knight from 16th-century Great Britain that that worked under Mary Stuart sent to fight Jonathan Joestar by Dio's orders. After being resurrected, Bruford still possessed a warrior's code of honor as he asked for Dio's blessing to duel Jonathan, once Jonathan made a direct hit on him after destroying his arms, Bruford regained his former humanity from the Hamon slowly destroying his body. Accepting his defeat with grace, noting he lost his hatred, Bruford only expressed only content to be reunited with Mary in the afterlife. After learning of Jonathan's name, Bruford gives the youth his sword named Luck, which he renamed Pluck (writing a "P" with his blood) before he died and completely turned to ash.
In Japanese, he is voiced by Kenjiro Tsuda in the anime, Nobutoshi Canna in the 2006 video game, and Tōru Nara in the 2007 film. In English, he is voiced by Tony Oliver.
Wang Chan (ワンチェン, Wan Chen)
Wang Chan (died February 9, 1889) is a Chinese apothecary who provides Dio with the poison to kill George Joestar, the same kind he used to kill his own father Dario years ago. Later, he gets brought back to the Joestar Estate and narrowly escapes the flames. As Wang Chan searches for the Stone Mask in the rubble, Dio emerges and turns him into his zombie servant. He serves loyally, and after Dio's penultimate defeat, he takes his master's head on board the ship carrying Jonathan and Erina. Despite his efforts and Jonathan being mortally wounded by Dio, Wang Chan is killed by Jonathan, who uses Hamon to destroy his head and subsequently control his corpse in order to sabotage the engine of the ship and ensure its destruction with Dio and the other zombies on board.
In Japanese, he is voiced by Hiroshi Naka in the anime, Kazumi Tanaka in the 2006 video game, and Jun Itoda in the 2007 film. In English, he is voiced by Doug Stone.

George Joestar (ジョージ・ジョースター, Jōji Jōsutā)

George Joestar is Jonathan's father. Left widowed after his wife died in a carriage accident, he adopts Dio upon the death of his father Dario, but is poisoned by Dio several years later. As Dio was being arrested for the poisoning, he attempted to stab Jonathan, but George stood in the way and took the hit, dying from his wounds.
In Japanese, he is voiced by Masashi Sugawara in the anime and Tsutomu Isobe in the 2006 video game and 2007 film. In English, he is voiced by Marc Diraison.

Danny (ダニー, Danī)

Danny is Jonathan's childhood dog. Becoming Jonathan's best friend, he is later murdered by Dio by being placed in an incinerator.

Dario Brando (ダリオ・ブランドー, Dario Burandō)

Dario Brando is Dio's father. He attempted to rob an unconscious George at the scene of the carriage accident that killed George's wife, but a misunderstanding leads to George thinking that Dario had saved him. An alcoholic, he is abusive towards Dio, ultimately leading to his death after being poisoned by Dio. As he died, he sent a letter to George requesting that he adopt Dio, which he did.
In Japanese, he is voiced by Tadashi Miyazawa in the anime, Kōji Yada in the 2006 video game, and Kazuhiro Ozawa in the 2007 film. In English, he is voiced by Steve Kramer.

Tonpetty (トンペティ, Tonpeti)

Tonpetty is a Tibetan monk who mastered Hamon and trained Will, Dire, and Straizo in it; he warned Will that he foresaw Will dying if he continued to train in Hamon, but Will brushed it off. He later accompanies them to their fight alongside Jonathan and Speedwagon against Dio, in which Will and Dire are both killed. He ultimately fights off Dio and his remaining zombies. His fate is unknown; he is last seen waving Jonathan and Erina goodbye as they go off on their honeymoon to America.
In Japanese, he is voiced by Tamio Ōki in the anime, Osamu Saka in the 2006 video game, and Yoshisada Sakaguchi in the 2007 film. In English, he is voiced by Michael McConnohie.

Dire (ダイアー, Daiā)

Dire is one of Tonpetty's pupils, and a close friend of Will and Straizo. He joins them, Jonathan, and Speedwagon in their fight against Dio, but is frozen to death by Dio.
In Japanese, he is voiced by Taketora in the anime and Yukitoshi Hori in the 2006 video game; he does not appear in the 2007 film. In English, he is voiced by Paul St. Peter.

Jack the Ripper (切り裂きジャック, Kirisaki Jakku)

Jack the Ripper is a fictionalized version of the British serial killer of the same name. After a failed attempt at attacking Dio, Dio takes him in and turns him into a zombie. Under Dio's control, he subsequently ambushes Jonathan, Speedwagon, and Will as they rode in a carriage, and murders the carriage's driver. Will attacks and badly injures Jack, and Jonathan delivers the killing blow.
In Japanese, he is voiced by Naomi Kusumi in the anime and Hisao Egawa in the 2006 video game. In English, he is voiced by Paul St. Peter.

Poco (ポコ, Poko)

Poco is a young boy who is first seen, under Dio's control, attempting to pickpocket Jonathan's group. However, Jonathan later saves him from being attacked by some of Dio's zombies. He subsequently joins Jonathan, and repays him in their battle against Tarkus by pulling a lever to allow the group into a room Tarkus was hiding in. His fate is unknown; he is last seen waving Jonathan and Erina goodbye as they go off on their honeymoon to the United States.
In Japanese, he is voiced by Yumiko Kobayashi in the anime and Daisuke Sakaguchi in the 2006 video game; he does not appear in the 2007 film. In English, he is voiced by Bennett Abara.

Poco's sister (ポコの姉, Poko no Ane)

Poco's older sister is first seen fending off the cowardly Poco from other boys who bullied him, while also castigating Poco for his cowardice. However, she inspires Poco to become more courageous. She is later kidnapped by Dio, but is saved by Jonathan. Her fate is unknown; she is last seen waving Jonathan and Erina goodbye as they go off on their honeymoon to America.
In Japanese, she is voiced by Aya Endō in the anime. In English, she is voiced by Dorothy Elias-Fahn.

Tarkus (タルカス, Tarukasu) (Note: "Tarukus" in official English releases.)

Tarkus was a knight in 16th-century Great Britain who served as one of Mary Stuart's retainers alongside Bruford. He and Bruford are resurrected by Dio and turned into zombies under Dio's control, and are subsequently sent to attack Jonathan and his party. Tarkus is responsible for killing Will. He then went to hide inside a passage, but with Poco's assistance, Jonathan fights him and ultimately kills him.
In Japanese, he is voiced by Tetsu Inada in the anime, Daisuke Gōri in the 2006 video game, and Yoshinori Sonobe in the 2007 film. In English, he is voiced by Jamieson Price.

=== Part 2: Battle Tendency ===
Set in 1938–1939, about 50 years after the events of Phantom Blood.

Joseph Joestar (ジョセフ・ジョースター, Josefu Jōsutā)

Joseph (born September 27, 1920) is the main protagonist of Battle Tendency and the grandson of Jonathan Joestar. Having been brought up by his grandmother Erina and Speedwagon, he developed a coarser and more rebellious attitude than that of his gentlemanly grandfather, but he still has a noble heart. While able to use Hamon like his grandfather, Joseph is not initially as skilled in its use until he trains under Lisa Lisa. He initially uses a pair of Hamon-empowered clackers in battle, but relies more on mind games rather than brute strength in fights, employing his uncanny ability to predict his opponent's actions down to what they say. He returns as a main character in Stardust Crusaders. Now 50 years older, he has acquired the vine-like Stand Hermit Purple (隠者の紫(ハーミットパープル), Hāmitto Pāpuru) which he uses to fight or take 'spirit photos' of faraway things using electronic equipment such as cameras and television sets (though doing so destroys said equipment). He can also use Hermit Purple's vines as wires to channel Hamon. Joseph leads the team of men to confront Dio in Egypt to save his daughter, Holly Kujo. He returns as a supporting character in Diamond Is Unbreakable, where he meets his illegitimate son Josuke Higashikata and is shown to be physically and mentally weaker now due to old age. While Joseph doesn't make an appearance in Golden Wind or Stone Ocean, Araki has stated that he is likely still alive.
In Japanese, he is voiced by Tomokazu Sugita (young) and Unshō Ishizuka (old) in the 2012 anime and subsequent media; Chikao Ohtsuka in the 1993 OVA; and Tōru Ōkawa (young) and Hōchū Ōtsuka (old) in the 1998 video game. In English, he is voiced by Benjamin Diskin (young) and Richard Epcar (old) in the 2012 anime and subsequent media, and Michael Bennett in the OVA.
Rudol von Stroheim (ルドル・フォン・シュトロハイム, Rudoru Fon Shutorohaimu)
Rudol von Stroheim (died February 1943) is a commander of the Nazi forces sent to research Santana in Mexico after the other Pillar Men were discovered in Rome. Stroheim is responsible for not only saving the life of Speedwagon, though only for intel on the Stone Mask for his government, but also helping Joseph defeat Santana by blowing himself up. He returns later as a cyborg to assist in the fight against Kars, upgrading himself with ultraviolet lamps. After providing Joseph with his artificial hand prior to World War II, Stroheim dies in 1943 on the front-line during the final days of the Battle of Stalingrad while trying to cover Nazi troops retreating from the city.
In Japanese, he is voiced by Atsushi Imaruoka. In English, he is voiced by Dan Woren.
Caesar Anthonio Zeppeli (シーザー・アントニオ・ツェペリ, Shīzā Antonio Tseperi)
Caesar Zeppeli (died 1939) is a suave ladies' man and the grandson of Will A. Zeppeli. He is rather cool and collected, especially compared to Joseph, with whom he is grudgingly paired to fight the Pillar Men. But over time, Joseph starts to grow on him so much that he is able to understand his strange thought patterns and they form an unbeatable duo. He infuses the Hamon into soap bubbles he creates with his specially-made gloves. He dies fighting against Wamuu, but is able to transport his remaining Hamon for Joseph just like his grandfather did for Jonathan.
In Japanese, he is voiced by Takuya Satō. In English, he is voiced by Bryce Papenbrook.
Pillar Men (柱の男, Hashira no Otoko)
The Pillar Men are the main antagonists of Battle Tendency, the last four members of an ancient race of humanoids encased in pillars whose extraordinary strength, intelligence, and lifespan made them revered as gods and demons. But Kars, motivated by his race's true potential, wiped out his people when they opposed him for endangering the world with the Stone Mask. Despite their apathy to humans and Kars's conduct, the other Pillar Men are chivalrous warriors who battle Hamon users in fair fights. Each has total control over their body, able to transform it to suit their needs while able to digest non-Hamon users via physical contact, Kars, Esidisi, and Wamuu having honed unique specialties called Modes (流法(モード), Mōdo) to combat Hamon users.
Santana (サンタナ, Santana) (Note: "Santviento" in official English releases.)
Santana is discovered in a Mexican pyramid in 1938 by Straizo's Speedwagon Foundation team and then taken by the Nazi forces under Stroheim for live human experiments to see if he can be used to power the German army, even using a Stone Mask vampire on him to see how much more powerful he is. Santana escapes, as he can contort his body to escape through a ventilation shaft, and shows he has mastered human language and the mechanisms of the Germans' weaponry when he manages to withstand their attacks. Joseph and Stroheim manage to stop him by escaping to the outside, as Joseph traps him in a well at high noon, turning him back to stone. His remains are taken to a Speedwagon Foundation laboratory while permanently exposed to ultraviolet lamps to trap him.
In Japanese, he is voiced by Kenji Nomura. In English, he is voiced by Kaiji Tang.
Esidisi (エシディシ, Eshidishi)
Esidisi has an erratic temper, quick to sob uncontrollably and just as quick to calm himself down. His Heat Control Mode (怪焔王の流法(モード), Kaiennō no Mōdo) allows him to make his blood boil to 500 °C (932 °F), which he injects into his foes to burn them alive by extending his needle-like blood vessels out of his own body. Esidisi's search for the Super Aja leads him to Venice, where he faces Joseph after murdering Loggins. Claiming to have intimate knowledge of The Art of War as he was in China during the lifetime of Sun Tzu, Esidisi matches Joseph's own quick wits in a battle of deception. But Joseph takes advantage of Esidisi's lack of knowledge of sleight of hand to defeat him with a Hamon attack via a cut and restore rope trick, destroying Esidisi's body. Esidisi survives, but is reduced to a disembodied nervous system, possessing the body of Suzi Q to get her to mail the Super Aja to Kars, and then plans to destroy her from the inside with her heated blood killing the Hamon users. However, Joseph and Caesar's contrasting Hamon abilities force Esidisi out of Suzi Q's body, which results in the weakened Pillar Man's permanent death when exposed to the sunlight.
In Japanese, he is voiced by Keiji Fujiwara. In English, he is voiced by Chris Jai Alex.
Wamuu (ワムウ, Wamū)
Wamuu (C.8,000 BCE-1939) is Esidisi and Kars' loyal servant, who is a strong and honorable warrior, but reflexively attacks anyone who steps on his own shadow. His Wind Mode (風の流法(モード), Kaze no Mōdo) allows him to control the air in his lungs, turning it into a powerful wind at his disposal, from using it like a razor sharp blade to rendering him invisible. He spares Joseph's life after the young man wounds him, allowing him a month's reprieve to master Hamon while placing a poison ring in the human's heart as added incentive while revealing the antidote in his lip piercing. His next fight is against Caesar, who manages to hold his own, but cannot defeat Wamuu's Wind Mode. He fatally wounds Caesar, allowing the dying man to obtain the antidote out of respect for the human's valiant effort. Wamuu later faces off against Joseph in a deadly chariot race, blinding himself to regain a psychological advantage over his opponent, before he is defeated by Joseph's wits and Hamon mastery. As Wamuu's disembodied head lays dying, Joseph eases the Pillar Man's passing by giving him drops of his own blood. Wamuu returns the favor by killing off a horde of vampires that attempts to kill Joseph in revenge, asking Joseph to take the antidote to give him peace of mind while expressing gratitude for facing such a worthy opponent.
In Japanese, he is voiced by Akio Otsuka. In English, he is voiced by Paul St. Peter.
Kars (カーズ, Kāzu)
Kars (born C.10,000 BCE) is the leader of the Pillar Men and the creator of the Stone Masks. He is intelligent and ruthless, and single minded in his dedication to become the Ultimate Being (究極の生命体(アルティミット・シイング), Arutimitto Shiingu). This led to Kars wiping out his own people when they deemed his intention as sheer madness. Later facing Hamon users in his quest for a Super Aja stone to perfect the mask's use for his kind, Kars developed a Light Mode (光の流法(モード), Hikari no Mōdo), which allows him to produce saw-bladed appendages from his body which produce a radiant glow. Unlike his subordinates, Kars has no honor whatsoever and intends to fulfill his goals by any means. Kars finally succeeds in getting the stone by deceiving Lisa Lisa during their match with a vampire decoy and then tricking the Nazis into exposing him to ultraviolet rays while wearing the Aja-embedded stone mask. Once evolved, now immune to sunlight and able to tap into his own genetic structure, Kars can produce animal-like extensions of himself, undergo reactive evolutionary mutations, and utilize Hamon. In the end, Kars is defeated as a result of his own hubris, using a Hamon attack on Joseph, who uses the Super Aja to intercept it in a volcano. The resulting eruption blasts Kars into the vacuum of space, causing his immortal body to freeze solid. Because he is unable to die, he drifts through space for the remainder of time, eventually ceasing thought.
In Japanese, he is voiced by Kazuhiko Inoue. In English, he is voiced by John DeMita.
Lisa Lisa (リサリサ, Risa Risa)
Lisa Lisa (born c. 1888) is a mysterious female Hamon master and Caesar's Hamon teacher who lives in Venice. Lisa Lisa is one of the few remaining Hamon users and keeper of the Super Aja, a perfectly cut Red Stone of Aja which she guards from the Pillar Men. She is revealed to be Joseph's mother Elizabeth (エリザベス, Erizabesu), who Erina saved as an infant on the night of Jonathan's death and entrusted to Straizo. Elizabeth married Erina's son George Joestar II and was forced to go on the run after killing her husband's murderer, one of Dio's surviving zombies who infiltrated the Royal Air Force. Lisa Lisa fights with Hamon by conducting it through her specially made scarf. Because of her Hamon abilities, she appears to be in her mid 20s despite actually being in her 50s.
In Japanese, she is voiced by Atsuko Tanaka. In English, she is voiced by Wendee Lee.
Suzi Q (スージーQ, Sūjī Kyū)
Lisa Lisa's personal assistant who is ditzy and forgetful but loyal to her cause. She develops a crush on Joseph after seeing his face without a special Hamon training mask on for the first time. She is possessed by a disembodied Esidisi and is forced to send the Super Aja to the Pillar Man's allies and then attack the others before Caesar and Joseph manage to use Hamon to force the Pillar Man out of her body without endangering her life. She nurses Joseph back to health after his battle with Kars, and then becomes his wife in the end of Battle Tendency, but forgets to let everyone else know that Joseph survived his battle with Kars. She later gives birth to their daughter Holly. Suzi Q makes a return appearance in Stardust Crusaders to watch over her daughter while Joseph and Jotaro are en route to Cairo to destroy Dio.
In Japanese, she is voiced by Sachiko Kojima in the 2012 anime and Ryōko Kinomiya in the 1993 OVA. In English, she is voiced by Stephanie Sheh in the 2012 anime; her voice in the OVA is unknown.

=== Part 3: Stardust Crusaders ===
Set from 1987–1988, the series follows Jotaro Kujo and his comrades who travel to Egypt from Japan in search of the evil and immortal vampire Dio Brando, now referred to only as Dio.

Jotaro Kujo (空条 承太郎, Kūjō Jōtarō)

The main protagonist of Stardust Crusaders and the grandson of Joseph Joestar through Holly. He is depicted as a rough delinquent with a kind heart as he journeys to Egypt with his grandfather and allies to defeat Dio and save his mother's life. Jotaro tends to have an introverted mindset, rarely showing emotion. However, he uses this to his advantage to keep calm and make a plan in a dire situation. His Stand is Star Platinum (星の白金(スタープラチナ), Sutā Purachina) whose power is incredible strength, speed, and precision. Star Platinum also has enhanced eyesight, allowing Jotaro to see things that can normally not be seen with the human eye. Later on, Star Platinum gains the ability Star Platinum: The World (星の白金(スタープラチナ) 世界(ザ・ワールド), Sutā Purachina Za Wārudo), allowing Star Platinum to stop time. He returns in Diamond Is Unbreakable to meet his biological uncle Josuke while investigating enemy stands in the town of Morioh. Since Dio's defeat, he has become a famed marine biologist. He makes a minor appearance in Golden Wind when he sends Koichi Hirose to Italy to spy on Dio's son, Giorno Giovanna. He returns in Stone Ocean to aid his daughter, Jolyne Cujoh, against the forces of Enrico Pucci, but falls unconscious after both his Stand and memory discs were stolen by Pucci's Stand, Whitesnake. Pucci uses Jotaro's memories to aid in his plan to transform Whitesnake into C-Moon, and Jolyne spends most of the Part trying to retrieve Jotaro's discs. After the discs are returned to him, he awakens and assists Jolyne in the final battle with Pucci. He nearly kills Pucci, but is killed instead after C-Moon evolves into Made in Heaven. However, Jotaro appears to have been revived after Pucci is killed and the universe resets once more, as Pucci's death also erases his existence. While he is not seen in the ending of Part 6, it is mentioned that his daughter and her allies are driving off to meet him, although unlike Jotaro, the remainders come with alternative names.
In Japanese, he is voiced by Daisuke Ono and Natsumi Takamori (child) in the 2014 anime and all subsequent appearances, Jūrōta Kosugi in the 1993 OVA, and Kiyoyuki Yanada in the 1998 game. In English, he is voiced by Matthew Mercer and Dorothy Elias-Fahn (child) in the 2014 anime and all subsequent appearances, and Abie Hadjitarkhani in the 1993 OVA.
Mohammed Avdol (モハメド・アヴドゥル, Mohamedo Avuduru)
An Egyptian ally of Joseph and Jotaro Kujo from Cairo, a fortune teller who narrowly escaped from Dio and helped Joseph understand Stands. His Stand is Magician's Red (魔術師の赤(マジシャンズレッド), Majishanzu Reddo), which allows him to manipulate fire, usually in the shape of the ankh. Magician's Red's signature move is Crossfire Hurricane (クロスファイヤーハリケーン, Kurosufaiyā Harikēn), which sends out several fiery ankhs at the target. While in India, Avdol is seemingly killed by the combined efforts of Hol Horse and J. Geil, but is later revealed to have survived and rejoins the group at the Red Sea. During the group's infiltration of Dio's mansion, Avdol is vaporized after he sacrifices himself to save Polnareff and Iggy from Vanilla Ice.
In Japanese, he is voiced by Kenta Miyake in the 2014 anime and subsequent appearances, Masashi Ebara in All Star Battle, Kiyoshi Kobayashi in the 1993 OVA, and Hisao Egawa in the 1998 game. In English, he is voiced by Chris Tergliafera in the 2014 anime and J. S. Gilbert in the 1993 OVA.
Noriaki Kakyoin (花京院 典明, Kakyōin Noriaki)
Kakyoin is a highschool student that Dio inflicted with a mind-controlling flesh bud and sends after Jotaro, only for life is instead saved by Jotaro with Kakyoin pledging to help him kill Dio. His Stand is Hierophant Green (法皇の緑(ハイエロファントグリーン), Haierofanto Gurīn), which he can shrink down to enter people and control them from the inside, produce strange tendrils that can thrash people, or perform a long-ranged attack using blasts of green energy known as Emerald Splash. Hierophant Green was originally known as Hierophant Emerald (ハイエロファントエメラルド, Haierofanto Emerarudo). He is later killed by Dio in Egypt and uses his final moments to inform the group about The World's ability. The spin-off manga Crazy Diamond's Demonic Heartbreak reveals that Kakyoin was born in Morioh and ended up under Dio's control during his family's vacation to Egypt when the villain uses his younger cousin as a hostage.
In Japanese, he is voiced by Daisuke Hirakawa in the 2014 anime and subsequent appearances, Kōji Yusa in All Star Battle, Hirotaka Suzuoki in the 1993 OVA, and Mitsuaki Madono in the 1998 game. In English, he is voiced by Kyle Hebert in the 2014 anime and Doug Boyd in the 1993 OVA.
Jean Pierre Polnareff (ジャン・ピエール・ポルナレフ, Jan Piēru Porunarefu)
A French traveler initially under Dio's control, Polnareff attacks Jotaro's group during their stay in Hong Kong before being defeated by Avdol. After reforming, he joins them on the hunt for Dio in order to find his sister's murderer, J. Geil. Polnareff is chivalrous and honorable, but is also goofy and naive, and tends to get into trouble frequently. His Stand is Silver Chariot (銀の戦車(シルバーチャリオッツ), Shirubā Chariottsu), an armored knight wielding a rapier that can boost its blinding speed further by casting off its armor while producing a series of afterimages, while sacrificing defense. Polnareff later makes an appearance during the events of Golden Wind, having been crippled by Diavolo who stole the Arrows from him. Polnareff kept one arrow he intended to give to Giorno's gang, but was forced to use it on himself with his dying breath to enhance his Stand into Chariot Requiem (チャリオッツ・レクイエム, Chariottsu Rekuiemu) as a final gambit to protect the arrow. Chariot Requiem, acting on its master's last command, can manipulate the souls of others in various ways like causing souls to swap bodies with someone nearby. Further exposure to Chariot Requiem causes living bodies and souls to mutate. Chariot Requiem acts as a shadow to people's souls, and when they look at it, its shadow always falls in the opposite direction. It creates a sun-like light source behind them but if that light source is destroyed Chariot Requiem is destroyed as well. Chariot Requiem's abilities end up saving Polnareff as they transfer his soul into Coco Jumbo, a turtle that was used by Giorno's gang. After Chariot Requiem is destroyed, Polnareff still manages to survive inside the turtle's body and now accompanies Passione's new leader, Giorno.
In Japanese, he is voiced by Fuminori Komatsu and Ayumi Fujimura (child) in the 2014 anime and subsequent appearances, Hiroaki Hirata in All Star Battle, Katsuji Mori in the 1993 OVA, Akira Negishi in the 2002 game, and Tsutomu Tareki in the 1998 game. In English, he is voiced by Doug Erholtz and Erica Mendez (child) in the 2014 anime and Mark Atherlay in the 1993 OVA.
Iggy (イギー, Igī)
A stray Boston Terrier who thwarted the New York animal control officers for years until Avdol managed to capture the dog for the Speedwagon Foundation. He is recruited to the group when they arrive in Egypt. To keep him calm, the Speedwagon Foundation and the Joestar Group offer him coffee-flavored chewing gum as a treat for his compliance. His Stand The Fool (愚者(ザ・フール), Za Fūru) is one of few that possess a physical form, a biomechanical being with two wheels instead of hindlegs that can manipulate sand and dirt, forming wings to allow Iggy to glide away from danger. The Fool can also use sand to shape-shift into different objects, and even people. Iggy is thought to be a self-serving coward as he avoids fighting N'Doul and many other Stand users as the group heads to Cairo, but he shows his intelligence during his fight with Pet Shop and his bravery and loyalty when he saves Polnareff from Vanilla Ice at the cost of his life.
In Japanese, he is voiced by Misato Fukuen in the 2014 anime and subsequent appearances, and Shigeru Chiba in All Star Battle. In English, he is voiced by Derek Stephen Prince in the 2014 anime.
Hol Horse (ホル・ホース, Horu Hōsu)
An arrogant cowboy and the wielder of the Emperor (皇帝(エンペラー), Enperā) Stand, which takes the form of a revolver. Upon being fired, the Emperor can control the bullet's flight path, allowing it to turn in midair. He prefers to operate with a partner, as his Stand is fairly weak and not effective without backup. Hol Horse is originally hesitant on working for Dio, and even attempts to shoot him behind his back, but eventually accepts Dio as a master after he experiences the power of Dio's Stand first hand. While originally seen working with J. Geil, he later becomes partners with Boingo with hope to kill the Joestars, but accidentally gets shot by his own Stand, incapacitating him. Hol Horse is among the surviving minions of Dio who attempt to resume normal lives after his death, becoming the protagonist of the spin-off manga, Crazy Diamond's Demonic Heartbreak; taking place a month before the events of Diamond is Unbreakable. Hol Horse travels to Morioh to retrieve a Stand wielding parrot named Petsounds who once belonged to Dio after he killed his previous owner, forming an alliance with Josuke Higashikata.
In Japanese, he is voiced by Hidenobu Kiuchi in the 2014 anime and subsequent appearances, Hōchū Ōtsuka in All Star Battle, Norio Wakamoto in the 1993 OVA, and Yoshito Yasuhara in the 1998 game. In English, he is voiced by Imari Williams in the 2014 anime and Roger L. Jackson in the 1993 OVA.
Enya the Hag (Enya Geil) (エンヤ婆（エンヤ・ガイル）, En'ya-baa (En'ya Gairu)) (Note: "Enyaba" in official English releases.)
An elderly woman with two right hands who is Dio's apparent confidant in Part 3, she is revealed in Part 4 to have played a role in awakening Dio and the Joestar line's ability to use Stands through ancient weapons known as the Bow and Arrow. She provided Yoshihiro Kira with one Bow and Arrow set years before the events of Part 4, later revealed in Part 5 to have acquired the Arrows from Diavolo. Her Stand Justice (正義(ジャスティス), Jasutisu), a massive mist with a skull and hands, allows her to manipulate anything with an open wound like a puppet. After the death of her son J. Geil, one of Dio's assassins who made an enemy out of Polnareff, Enya decides to personally attack the Joestar group before being captured and later killed by her allies to keep the nature of Dio's Stand a secret.
In Japanese, she is voiced by Reiko Suzuki in the 2014 anime and All Star Battle, and Rika Fukami in the 1993 OVA. In English, she is voiced by Barbara Goodson in the 2014 anime and Elaine Clark (young) and Kathy Garver (old) in the 1993 OVA.
J. Geil (J・ガイル, Jei. Gairu) (Note: "Centerfold" in official English releases.)
J. Geil is the son of Enya the Hag and is responsible for raping and murdering Jean Pierre Polnareff's sister Chérie (Note: "Sherry" in official English releases.) Polnareff. J. Geil is sadistic and cruel, and constantly taunts Polnareff. Like his mother, he has two right hands, which was the sole clue Polnareff had for years. His Stand is Hanged Man (吊られた男(ハングドマン), Hangudo Man), a light-based Stand which manifests itself through reflections. Any attack done on a person's reflection will be mirrored on the person themself. He first shows by making his Stand appear in front of Polnareff and forcing him to separate from the rest of the group, making him an easy target for him and his partner Hol Horse. After a short confrontation between Emperor and Silver Chariot, Muhammad Avdol joins the fight but is quickly disposed of by a combination of Emperor and Hanged Man. Later, Polnareff finally gets his revenge with Kakyoin's help and brutally cuts down J. Geil with Silver Chariot.
In Japanese, he is voiced by Takuya Kirimoto in the 2014 anime and Mugihito in the 1993 OVA. In English, he is voiced by Tom Fahn in the 2014 anime and Dave Arendash in the 1993 OVA.
N'Doul (ンドゥール, N'Dūru)
N'Doul was a blind assassin loyal to Dio, he is the first of the Egypt 9 Glory Gods the Joestar Group encounters upon entering Egypt, attacking them in the middle of the Sahara. His Stand, Geb (ゲブ神, Gebu-shin), allows him to control water. He manages to injure Kakyoin by using Geb to slash his eyes, incapacitating him for a majority of the latter half of the arc. After Avdol finds out that N'Doul could only locate the group through the sounds they make, Jotaro forces Iggy to cooperate with them, as he was the only one capable of detecting N'Doul's attacks. After N'Doul's defeat by Jotaro, he commits suicide to keep Dio's Stand a secret.
In Japanese, he is voiced by Kentarō Itō in the 2014 anime and subsequent appearances, and Koji Nakata in the 1993 OVA. In English, he is voiced by Greg Chun in the 2014 anime.
Boingo (ボインゴ)
A young Stand User and member of the Egypt 9 Glory Gods, a shy boy whose book-like Stand, Tohth, allows him to see the intermediate future and that what it predicts to happen is set in stone. He stays in the shadows while initially attempting to take out the Joestar Group with his older brother Oingo, only for his brother to be hospitalized. Boingo is later kidnapped by Hol Horse and forced to team up with the assassin to avenge his brother in Cairo, only for Hol Horse to get hospitalized with Boingo deciding to no longer pursue the Joestar Group despite being mauled by Iggy. Boingo becomes a supporting character of the spin-off manga, Crazy Diamond's Demonic Heartbreak; accompanying Hol Horse to Morioh to retrieve Petsounds.
In Japanese, he is voiced by Motoko Kumai in the 2014 anime; he does not appear in the 1993 OVA. In English, he is voiced by Jessica Gee-George in the 2014 anime.
Daniel J. D'Arby (ダニエル・J・ダービー, Danieru Jei. Dābī)
Daniel J. D'Arby is an expert and inveterate gambler and is a member of the Egypt 9 Glory Gods, meeting the Joestar Group in Cairo and tricking them into wagering their souls in various gambles. However, D'Arby is not afraid to cheat to win a match, and ends up taking the souls of Polnareff and Joseph. Jotaro challenges D'Arby at poker, which the gambler comments is his strongest game. However Jotaro's unreadable poker face, intimidation, and use of Star Platinum to play mindgames proves too much for him, as D'Arby tries to force himself to call Jotaro's bet, he falls apart completely and becomes a hysteric mess, admitting defeat in his heart. Polnareff, Joseph and the hundreds of other souls D'Arby had collected over the years were freed from his collection. His Stand is Osiris (オシリス神, Oshirisu-shin), which has the power to take the souls of those whom D'Arby defeats in his games and store them as chips.
In Japanese, he is voiced by Banjō Ginga in the 2014 anime and subsequent appearances, and Kenji Utsumi in the 1993 OVA. In English, he is voiced by Cam Clarke in the 2014 anime.
Terence T. D'Arby (テレンス・T・ダービー, Terensu Tī. Dābī)
Terence T. D'Arby is the butler of Dio's Egyptian mansion, the younger brother of Daniel and a member of the Egypt 9 Glory Gods. He is an expert in playing video games. Like his brother's, his Stand Atum (アトゥム神, Atumu-shin) also carries the power of stealing the souls of whom D'Arby defeats in his games, storing these souls inside dolls. Terence is seen as far more dangerous than his brother, largely because his Stand also has the ability to read the minds of other people, though limited to only answering "yes or no" questions. Despite the limitation, he was able to defeat Kakyoin and steal his soul, but like his brother, also ended up losing to Jotaro as he was unable to notice Joseph helping Jotaro cheat at the baseball game they were playing.
In Japanese, he is voiced by Junichi Suwabe in the 2014 anime; he does not appear in the 1993 OVA. In English, he is voiced by Xander Mobus in the 2014 anime.
Vanilla Ice (ヴァニラ・アイス, Vanira Aisu)
Vanilla Ice was the last Vampire created by Dio and one of the penultimate Stand Users the Joestar Group faces upon infiltrating Dio's Mansion, after the group is split up, he is sent to take out the team consisting of Avdol, Polnareff, and Iggy. Though he was aiming to dispatch all of them at once with a surprise attack, he only manages to kill Avdol, who shoved Polnareff and Iggy out of the way before the attack hit, later also killing Iggy. But Polnareff learns of Ice's vampire nature and uses Silver Chariot to draw him into the sunlight to instantly disintegrate him. His Stand is called Cream (クリーム, Kurīmu), whose power creates a spherical vacuum that completely disintegrates anything within its radius.
In Japanese, he is voiced by Show Hayami in the 2014 anime and subsequent appearances and in the 1998 game, Takeshi Aono in the 1993 OVA, and Hiroyuki Yoshino in All Star Battle. In English, he is voiced by Jalen K. Cassell in the 2014 anime.

=== Part 4: Diamond Is Unbreakable ===
Set in 1999, 10 years after the events of Stardust Crusaders, in the fictitious Japanese city of Morioh.

Josuke Higashikata (東方 仗助, Higashikata Jōsuke)

The main protagonist of Diamond Is Unbreakable, Josuke (born c.1983) is a freshman in Morioh who is the illegitimate son of Joseph Joestar. When Josuke was four years old, he awakened a Stand due to Dio's influence on the Joestar bloodline in the events of Stardust Crusaders. But because of his gentle nature, his Stand worked against him, causing him to become fatally ill, similar to Holly's illness in Stardust Crusaders. While en route to the hospital, his mother gets her car stuck in the snow, but an unknown delinquent with a pompadour helps his mother release the car from the snow and drive Josuke to safety. Overwhelmed by the selflessness and kindness of the unknown delinquent, Josuke wears his hair in a similar pompadour to honor him, and erupts into a violent rage if anyone insults his hair, as he associates his hair with the delinquent who saved him. Similar to Jotaro, he is a magnet for women with his good looks and skills. His Stand is Crazy Diamond (クレイジー・ダイヤモンド, Kureijī Daiyamondo), (Note: "Shining Diamond" in official English releases.) a close range Stand which has the ability to restore objects to their original form, including healing other people's injuries and also any inanimate object such as food and drink, for example it can use its ability to revert lemonade back to water, sugar and lemons. However, Crazy Diamond cannot be used to revive the dead, nor can it be used to heal Josuke himself.
In Japanese, he is voiced by Yūki Ono and Yō Taichi (child) in the anime and subsequent appearances, and Wataru Hatano in Eyes of Heaven and All Star Battle. In English, he is voiced by Billy Kametz and Maureen Price (child).
Yoshikage Kira (吉良 吉影, Kira Yoshikage)
The main antagonist of Diamond Is Unbreakable, Kira is a handsome office worker who holds a strong desire to live a simple life, but has a murderous obsession with female hands, stemming from an erotic experience he had with the Mona Lisa as a child. He has been murdering women in Morioh for over 15 years, with Reimi Sugimoto as the first of his victims. Once killing his victim, Kira will keep their severed hand as a "girlfriend", carrying it around with him and using it for various fetishtic purposes before discarding it when it begins to decay. Kira later manifests his Stand Killer Queen (キラークイーン, Kirā Kuīn) (Note: "Deadly Queen" in official English releases.) with the Arrow that his father Yoshihiro acquired from Enya, the Stand possessing the ability to turn any object into a bomb, with the explosion leaving no trace. Kira frequently uses Killer Queen to dispose evidence of his murders. The Stand also possesses a secondary ability called Sheer Heart Attack (シアーハートアタック, Shiā Hāto Atakku), (Note: "Heart Attack" in official English releases.) an indestructible tank-like bomb linked to Kira's left hand that relentlessly locks on to heat signatures. Kira is eventually exposed by Josuke's group acting on Reimi's behalf and murders a man named Kosaku Kawajiri (川尻 浩作, Kawajiri Kōsaku) while fleeing his pursuers, forcing Aya Tsuji into using her Stand and give him Kosaku's face and fingerprints before killing her off. Kira attempts concealing himself in the Kawajiri household while fighting his murderous urges, with Kosaku's son Hayato Kawajiri (川尻 早人, Kawajiri Hayato) eventually realizing the truth. Kira acquires a new ability when pierced by the Arrow a second time called Bites The Dust (負けて死ね(バイツァ・ダスト), Baitsa Dasuto; Kanji lit. "lose and die") which he implants in Hayato, placing the boy on a time-loop where anyone who learns of Kira's identity from the boy is killed with their death fixed for every future loop. But Hayato exploits the time loop to trick Kira into exposing himself and cancel Bites the Dust to defend himself against Josuke, eventually being killed off when run over by a reversing ambulance and later being dragged off by the spectral hands of Ghost Alley. He makes a return appearance in the side-story Dead Man's Questions as a wandering spirit with no knowledge of who he really is.
In Japanese, he is voiced by Toshiyuki Morikawa in the anime and subsequent appearances, and Rikiya Koyama in Eyes of Heaven and All Star Battle. In English, he is voiced by D. C. Douglas.
Koichi Hirose (広瀬 康一, Hirose Kōichi)
A classmate of Josuke's who meets him when Jotaro is searching for Josuke, resulting in the two becoming quick friends. Koichi is a young freshman in high school, and despite his age, he is very short. Throughout the series, he forms a student-teacher relationship with Jotaro. When Koichi is stabbed by the Arrow from Keicho Nijimura, he was initially rendered unconscious and thought to be fatally wounded, but soon awakened his Stand Echoes (エコーズ, Ekōzu), (Note: "Reverb" in official English releases.) which has three distinct forms, or Acts, that he gains as he develops as a character. However, Koichi can only call upon one at any given time. Echoes Act 1 can replicate sound effects, such as a train alarm; he can attach these sound effects as written kana to anything, and if he attaches them to an opponent, he can overwhelm them with sound. Echoes Act 2 also writes out sound effects in kana, but rather than replicating the noise, it replicates the phenomenon that would create that sound effect (e.g. attaching the word "whoosh" causes a gust of wind to blow by, or "sizzle" will cause something to glow with heat). Acts 1 and 2 are also long range, and Koichi can use either of them as a scout to find a specific target. Echoes Act 3 loses the former abilities and its long range, but gains the ability "3 Freeze", which causes a target to become extremely heavy to the point that it is incapable of moving. Act 3 also shows its own sentience separate of Koichi, which is rare in Stands. It talks in a monotone voice, and frequently says vulgar phrases in English.
In Japanese, he is voiced by Yuki Kaji in the anime and subsequent appearances, and Romi Park in Eyes of Heaven and All Star Battle. In English, he is voiced by Zach Aguilar.
Okuyasu Nijimura (虹村 億泰, Nijimura Okuyasu)
The youngest of the two Nijimura brothers who are responsible for creating the majority of Stand users in Morioh via the Bow and Arrow. Okuyasu is overly dependent on his elder brother Keicho to make hard decisions. After his brother dies, he seeks revenge against the user of the Stand Red Hot Chili Pepper, Akira Otoishi, and becomes friends with Josuke and Koichi. Okuyasu's father is a bizarre creature that can regenerate rapidly, rendering him immortal. He was mutated by a flesh bud made from Dio's cells after the latter's death at the hands of Jotaro. At first, Okuyasu and Keicho plotted to kill their father to relieve him of his suffering, creating Stand users via the Bow and Arrow for this very purpose. However, after he learns that his father still has sentience, he gives up on the plan. His Stand is The Hand (ザ・ハンド, Za Hando), which erases whatever space it swipes with its right hand, drawing objects closer to Okuyasu or drawing Okuyasu himself closer to an object. Should he erase the middle of an object, the two remaining halves will snap together (demonstrated when he erases the middle of a sign, causing it to say something different with the middle portion gone). While this ability is quite useful and could be devastating in the right hands, Okuyasu himself is rather unintelligent, rarely using it to its full potential.
In Japanese, he is voiced by Wataru Takagi and Konami Saito (child) in all appearances. In English, he is voiced by Jalen K. Cassell.
Keicho Nijimura (虹村 形兆, Nijimura Keichō)
The eldest of the two Nijimura brothers who are responsible for creating the majority of Stand users in Morioh via the Bow and Arrow. Keicho is a minor yet influential character in the arc. He is very abrasive and brutal, yet is far more intelligent than Okuyasu. He's the first to possess the Bow and Arrow in Morioh, using it to create potential Stand users that can kill his mutated father; however, after seeing how his father still has sentience, he has trouble dealing with the situation. He is later killed by Akira Otoishi, one of the Stand users who had his Stand activated thanks to Keicho. His Stand is Bad Company (バッド・カンパニー, Baddo Kanpanī), (Note: "Worse Company" in official English releases.) which is unique for taking the form of a miniature organised military force but with greatly lethal firepower.
In Japanese, he is voiced by Tomoyuki Shimura and Mariko Higashiuchi (child) in the anime and subsequent appearances. In English, he is voiced by Jason Marnocha and Morgan Berry (child).
Rohan Kishibe (岸辺 露伴, Kishibe Rohan)
An abrasive but well meaning mangaka who writes the manga Pink Dark Boy for Weekly Shōnen Jump. He eventually befriends Koichi and the two come across Reimi Sugimoto (杉本 鈴美, Sugimoto Reimi), a ghost who warns the two about a serial murderer in Morioh. It is revealed later that 15 years prior to the events of Diamond is Unbreakable, Reimi was Rohan's babysitter. On the night Reimi was murdered by Yoshikage Kira, she sneaks the four year old Rohan out the window to save his life. This inspires him to help Jotaro and the others find and stop Yoshikage Kira. His Stand is Heaven's Door (ヘブンズ・ドアー, Hebunzu Doā), which allows him to peel a person's skin open like a book and read their memories and abilities. He can also write commands in the pages which the recipient must follow. Heaven's Door originally appears as a manuscript that one must consciously look at to be placed under effect. Later on, it gains a physical form resembling the unnamed protagonist of Pink Dark Boy. Rohan is subject of multiple one-shot spinoffs such as Thus Spoke Kishibe Rohan and Rohan au Louvre.
In Japanese, he is voiced by Takahiro Sakurai in the anime and subsequent appearances, and Hiroshi Kamiya in Eyes of Heaven and All Star Battle. In English, he is voiced by Vic Mignogna in the anime and Landon McDonald in Thus Spoke Kishibe Rohan.
Akira Otoishi (音石 明, Otoishi Akira)
A rogue guitarist and enemy of Josuke, his Stand is Red Hot Chilli Pepper (レッド・ホット・チリ・ペッパー, Reddo Hotto Chiri Peppā), (Note: "Chili Pepper" in official English releases.) a long-range Stand that can control electricity. His awakening of a Stand makes him mad with power, and he steals Keicho Nijimura's arrow, killing him in the process. He tried to shoo away Jotaro afterwards, fearing Star Platinum's power. Otoishi is dangerously self-centered, using his newfound power to steal from various people and wreak havoc in the city, and even kill anyone who gets in his way without hesitation. He also dedicates himself to his craft as a guitarist; also desiring recognition or fame as a rock star. Akira is confident, but also smart enough to utilize his abilities to the fullest and is somewhat proficient in manipulation, evident through his battle with Okuyasu. However, although smart, he often fails to notice minor details that can lead to his downfall, as shown in his fight with Josuke. After losing to Josuke and being sent to prison, he no longer causes trouble as he fears retaliation from Jotaro. His last appearance was in the one-shot Thus Spoke Kishibe Rohan, asking Rohan Kishibe for autographs.
In Japanese, he is voiced by Showtaro Morikubo in all appearances. In English, he is voiced by Andrew Russell.
Yuya Fungami (噴上裕也, Fungami Yuya)
He is a member of a motorcycle gang who got into an accident and used his Stand, Highway Star (ハイウェイ・スター, Haiwei Sutā), (Note: "Highway Go Go" in official English releases.) to steal Josuke and Rohan's life energy in order to recover from their injuries. Introduced while attacking Josuke from a distance, accompanied by his three admirers, Yuya appears to be a vain, selfish and dishonest person. However, he demonstrates a sense of courage, bravery and high perception skills when joining the battle against Terunosuke Miyamoto, as he manages to save both Koichi and Josuke. His Stand possesses a disjointed set of powers that make fighting it a dangerous task, and even Josuke must flee the Stand to find the user and defeat him. Two of its basic but most notable features are its speed and range: Highway Star can run up to 60 km/h and maintain that running speed indefinitely to pursue its prey; Furthermore, its pursuit of Josuke around Morioh while Yuya was at Grape Hills Hospital demonstrates its great range, the stand is also capable of throwing a barrage of punches, creating illusions to lure in its prey and disassemble itself from its humanoid form into many foot shaped pieces that can more easily pursue a target.
In Japanese, he is voiced by Kishō Taniyama in all appearances. In English, he is voiced by Phillip Reich.

=== Part 5: Golden Wind ===
Set in Italy in 2001, two years after the events of Diamond is Unbreakable.

Giorno Giovanna (ジョルノ・ジョバァーナ, Joruno Jobāna)

The main protagonist of Golden Wind, born Haruno Shiobana (汐華 初流乃), Giorno is the illegitimate son of Dio. However, because Dio's head was attached to the decapitated body of Jonathan Joestar at the time of Giorno's conception, he is technically a Joestar, Jonathan's biological son, and bears the Joestar birthmark as proof of his Joestar lineage. Bearing a similarity to both men in regard to personality (Jonathan's sense of morality and Dio's indifference to his enemies), he is initially observed by Jotaro and Koichi in case he became a threat like Dio. Giorno's dream of becoming a "Gang-Star" in the Passione mob family formed after rescuing a wounded mafia member as a child, who gave him protection in exchange. Giorno was originally born with black hair, but it eventually became a blond color similar to Dio's when he fully awakened his Stand. As a combination of Dio and Jonathan, he is kind, caring, and calm, traits from Jonathan; but also confident, brutal, and a cunning strategist, traits from Dio. He aspires to overthrow Passione's boss, end the drug trade, and turn the gang into an organization which helps the people of Italy, akin to Robin Hood.
His Stand is named Gold Experience (ゴールド・エクスペリエンス, Gōrudo Ekusuperiensu), (Note: "Golden Wind" in official English releases.) which has the ability to imbue things with life, which is mostly used to turn inorganic objects into living organisms. Later, Giorno learns how to create body parts with Gold Experience, giving him the ability to heal himself and others (albeit causing significant pain in the process). Giorno can also use Gold Experience to sense the lifeforce of others. When the Stand Arrow chooses Giorno, his Stand becomes Gold Experience Requiem (ゴールド・エクスペリエンス・レクイエム, Gōrudo Ekusuperiensu Rekuiemu), (Note: "Golden Wind Requiem" in official English releases.) which greatly evolves its life-giving properties and also has the ability to return any kind of process back to a state of "zero", nullifying any desired action. The stand explaining that Giorno is consciously unaware of its full ability, Gold Experience Requiem's nullification even affects death, allowing the Stand to force a person into an infinite loop of endless deaths of varying causes.
In Japanese, he is voiced by Kensho Ono and Natsumi Fujiwara (child) in the anime and subsequent appearances, Daisuke Namikawa in Eyes of Heaven and All Star Battle, and Romi Park in the 2002 game. In English, he is voiced by Phillip Reich and Janice Kawaye (child).
Bruno Bucciarati (ブローノ・ブチャラティ, Burōno Bucharati)
Initially a caporegime in the Passione mafia family, Bucciarati teams up with Giorno and leads a group of rogue gang members against their boss. Bucciarati grew up in a fishing village and after his parents divorced, he chose to live with his father. When he was twelve years old, his father was shot by drug dealers who had hired his boat and when they tried to kill him in the hospital, Bruno fatally stabbed them. He entered the world of Passione for protection, but years later was horrified to discover that Passione was responsible for what happened to his father. Bucciarati's stand is Sticky Fingers (スティッキィ・フィンガーズ, Sutikkī Fingāzu), (Note: "Zipper Man" in official English releases.) which has the ability to place a fully functional zipper on any object just by touching it. For example, Sticky Fingers can place a zipper on a wall, unzip it, and then pass through the resulting opening. The zipper can also be used to take things or people apart, or even mismatch various objects, and he can use this ability on himself if necessary. Bucciarati's hatred of drugs leads him to help Giorno accomplish his dream of overthrowing the boss. During their first confrontation with Diavolo, Bucciarati is killed, but Giorno's Gold Experience manages to keep Bucciarati alive, albeit in a corpse-like state, until he fully passes on in the final battle with Diavolo after giving Giorno the arrow he needed to defeat the boss.
In Japanese, he is voiced by Yuichi Nakamura and Shizuka Ishigami (child) in the anime and subsequent appearances, Noriaki Sugiyama in Eyes of Heaven and All Star Battle, and Takahiro Sakurai in the 2002 game. In English, he is voiced by Ray Chase and Jeannie Tirado (child).
Leone Abbacchio (レオーネ・アバッキオ, Reōne Abakkio)
A member of Bucciarati's gang, Abbacchio is a former policeman who aspired to protect people, but became disillusioned upon learning about the extent of corruption in law enforcement. He learned to work with the contradictions, eventually accepting a bribe from a criminal. Sometime later a break-in was reported at an old man's house, committed by the same man had bribed him. As Abbacchio hesitated to shoot, his partner leapt in front of a bullet fired by the thief, dying in the process. Labelled a dirty cop, Abbacchio lost his job and fell into a drunken depression until Bucciarati recruited him. His Stand Moody Blues (ムーディー・ブルース, Mūdī Burūsu) (Note: "Moody Jazz" in official English releases.) can repeat the past movements of anything or anyone like a 3-D video recording, transforming into that person or thing. While doing so, Moody Blues becomes an easy target for enemies to attack, since it cannot defend itself when it is "rebroadcasting." Once it is out of "rebroadcasting" mode, it can attack again. Abbacchio can also use Moody Blues' transformations to disguise his Stand as a person. When Giorno joins the gang, Abbacchio trusts him the least out of the group and frequently confronts him on his decisions. Abbacchio is later stabbed in the chest by Diavolo after the boss disguised himself as a young soccer player while Abbacchio was using his Stand to recreate the boss's face. Despite his fatal wound, Abbachio was successful in recreating the boss's face and quickly imprinted it into a rock before dying. In the afterlife, he is reunited with his deceased partner, who commends him for his commitment towards helping his comrades.
In Japanese, he is voiced by Junichi Suwabe in the anime and subsequent appearances, and Tetsu Inada in the 2002 game. In English, he is voiced by Mick Lauer.
Guido Mista (グイード・ミスタ, Guīdo Misuta)
Another member of Bucciarati's gang. He was sentenced to prison for killing gang members that had attacked him after he'd come to the aid of a woman being assaulted, with the court not believing the truth that Mista had been acting in self defense, since he hadn't been injured. Somehow, through the will of destiny, all of the bullets fired at him had missed, and Mista fired back four shots with pin-point accuracy whilst under fire. Bucciarati arranged for the charges to be dropped, and recruited Mista to his gang. Mista uses a revolver as his weapon of choice in conjunction with his stand, Sex Pistols (セックス・ピストルズ, Sekkusu Pisutoruzu). (Note: "Six Bullets" in official English releases.) Sex Pistols is represented by six bullet-shaped humanoids, numbered from #1 through #7 with no #4. Mista controls them by telling them to send the bullet ricocheting in a certain direction. Each of them have distinct personalities; they love to eat, and if not fed, will not work. Sex Pistols has no #4, due to Mista's tetraphobia, associating the number 4 with bad luck or danger much like the Japanese and other Eastern cultures, despite being Italian.
In Japanese, he is voiced by Kohsuke Toriumi in the anime and subsequent appearances, Kenji Akabane in Eyes of Heaven and All Star Battle, and Kentarō Itō in the 2002 game. In English, he is voiced by Sean Chiplock.
Narancia Ghirga (ナランチャ・ギルガ, Narancha Giruga)
A member of Bucciarati's gang. He was abandoned by his father after his mother died from an eye disease. As a result, Narancia became a run-away street-living delinquent. He was savagely beaten by the police, after another delinquent he looked up to framed him for a burglary. He developed a persistent eye infection similar to his mother, having spent a year in a junior offender detention center. At age 15, filthy, ill and homeless, he was picked up by Fugo and taken to meet Bucciarati who funded his return to health. Narancia was so overwhelmed with Bucciarati's kindness that he vowed to follow him forever. After joining the gang, he befriends Fugo and looks up to him as a role-model and mentor. His Stand Aerosmith (エアロスミス, Earosumisu) (Note: "Li'l Bomber" in official English releases.) is a toy-like tiny airplane, equipped with machine guns and bombs to attack enemies. It detects expelled carbon dioxide on a radar-like display, but Narancia cannot distinguish between his targets and other sources of carbon dioxide such as innocent bystanders or open flames. Narancia is eventually attacked by Diavolo while he was in Giorno's body as a result of Silver Chariot Requiem resulting in him getting impaled on a gate. Though Giorno is able to heal his body of the punctured wounds Diavolo inflicted, Narancia's soul was already gone by the time his body healed.
In Japanese, he is voiced by Daiki Yamashita in the anime and subsequent appearances, Yūko Sanpei in Eyes of Heaven and All Star Battle, and Fujiko Takimoto in the 2002 game. In English, he is voiced by Kyle McCarley.
Pannacotta Fugo (パンナコッタ・フーゴ, Pannakotta Fūgo)
He was the first person to join Bucciarati's team. In the anime he was molested by his college professor when he was 13 years old, causing him to savagely beat his abuser, resulting in him being expelled and disowned by his family, who'd never cared much for his well-being at all. Fugo tends to have an erratic temper, erupting into a violent rage before quickly calming himself down. His Stand is Purple Haze (パープル・ヘイズ, Pāpuru Heizu), (Note: "Purple Smoke" in official English releases.) a humanoid with a violet-and-white diamond pattern skin and a glass gladiator's helmet. Its main form of attack comes from the three capsules on its knuckles, each of which contains a powerful virus that is released when any of the capsules are broken. Once released, the virus will spread and rapidly devour organic matter—a human body will be annihilated in about 30 seconds. However, the virus is destroyed by sunlight. Purple Haze is difficult for Fugo to control in even the best of situations, since it represents everything he hates about himself, which explains its manic behavior about cleanliness and its inability to distinguish friend from foe: Fugo has no immunity to the virus. He is the only member of Bucciarati's team who refuses to join him when Bucciarati decides to turn on the boss. He later stars in the light novel Purple Haze Feedback, which takes place after the events of Part 5. In Purple Haze Feedback, he is given the mission to eliminate Passione's remaining drug team to test his loyalty to the organization, as well as a form of atonement for his departure from Bucciarati's team. At the end of the novel, he and Giorno meet again, and having overcome his personal demons, Fugo swears loyalty to Giorno.
In Japanese, he is voiced by Junya Enoki in the anime and subsequent appearances, Hisafumi Oda in Eyes of Heaven and All Star Battle, and Hiroaki Miura in the 2002 game. In English, he is voiced by Ezra Weisz.
Trish Una (トリッシュ・ウナ, Torisshu Una)
Trish is the daughter of the boss, although she'd never met him, a result of her parents union when he was living under the pseudonym "Solido Naso." She is protected by Bruno's team from her father's enemies, until it is revealed he'd only had her protected so that he could eliminate the threat she posed to him due to her very existence. She eventually awakens her own Stand Spice Girl (スパイス・ガール, Supaisu Gāru) (Note: "Spicy Lady" in official English releases.) which has the ability to soften any material giving it a similar sensation to rubber.
In Japanese, she is voiced by Sayaka Senbongi in the anime and subsequent appearances, Nao Tōyama in Eyes of Heaven and All Star Battle, and Rio Natsuki in the 2002 game. In English, she is voiced by Lizzie Freeman.

Coco Jumbo (ココ・ジャンボ, Koko Janbo)

Coco Jumbo is a turtle gifted to the group by the boss. Its Stand, Mr. President (ミスター・プレジデント, Misutā Purejidento), manifests as an interdimensional hotel room inside its shell which the group use as a mobile safe house. During Chariot Requiem's attack on Rome, Polnareff's recently-deceased soul seeks refuge inside Mr. President and remains there even after Chariot Requiem's destruction.
Diavolo (ディアボロ, Diaboro)
The main antagonist of Golden Wind and dominant personality of Vinegar Doppio (ヴィネガー・ドッピオ, Vinegā Doppio), speculated to have come about as great enough cause of dissociative identity disorder to exist as two souls occupying the same body that shape shifts depending on the dominant persona. The youthful Doppio, unaware he is an alter ego, serves as Diavolo's middle man to his subordinates. Diavolo is the father of Trish Una and the boss of Passione. He is obsessed with erasing any trace of his past to preserve his anonymity, having Bucciarati's team escort Trish to his location so that he can murder her; he believes their link as genetic relatives could be used to track him, putting his anonymity in jeopardy. Doppio is killed while in Bucciarati's body during the effect of Chariot Requiem prior, Diavolo being in Guido's body with Trish's soul before returning to his body. Diavolo is ultimately defeat by Giorno, placed in an infinite loop of being killed thanks to the power of Gold Experience Requiem.
His Stand is King Crimson (キング・クリムゾン, Kingu Kurimuzon), (Note: "Emperor Crimson" in official English releases.) which has the ability to erase the time in which an action will take place, altering what happened in between two intangible points, the effect of which is a sudden time-skip covering up to ten seconds. Time flows normally for Diavolo in skipped time and he alone may move around objects in erased time (visually represented as Diavolo and the object superimposed on each other, in a fashion akin to Nude Descending a Staircase, No. 2). For example, this stops Risotto Nero from killing Diavolo when he takes control of Aerosmith in a last ditch-effort to take Diavolo with him, since he uses the time skip to move out of the way of the hail of bullets. King Crimson has a secondary ability called Epitaph (エピタフ, Epitafu) (Note: "Eulogy" in official English releases.) that exists as a second face on King Crimson's forehead and can be used to predict 10 seconds into the future. This method allows him to see within the erased time; any object or individual other than Diavolo must behave according to the prediction. If Epitaph shows him an undesirable outcome, time skip is used to move to a more desired position to counterattack as soon as the time skip ends. If Epitaph shows him an outcome that works in his favor, time skip will allow fate to play out said actions while Diavolo stays hidden. While Doppio does not possess a Stand himself, Diavolo allows him to wield King Crimson's arms and Epitaph.
In Japanese, he is voiced by Katsuyuki Konishi in the anime and subsequent appearances, Toshiyuki Morikawa in Eyes of Heaven and All Star Battle, and Mitsuru Miyamoto in the 2002 game. In English, he is voiced by Kellen Goff.
Hitman Team / Execution Squad (La Squadra Esecuzioni) (暗殺チーム, Ansatsu Chīmu)
An execution squad of Stand users within the Passione group under the leadership of Risotto Nero, consisting of Formaggio, Illuso, Prosciutto, Pesci, Melone, Ghiaccio, Sorbet and Gelato. Prior to the events of the series, Sorbet and Gelato planned to overthrow the boss, but the boss found out and had them brutally executed. The rest of the team serve as the main antagonists of the part's first half, planning to overthrow the Boss themselves via receiving his whereabouts from Trish.

=== Part 6: Stone Ocean ===
Set in 2011–2012 Florida, USA, ten years after the events of Golden Wind.

Jolyne Cujoh (空条 徐倫, Kūjō Jorīn)

The main protagonist of Stone Ocean, Jolyne Cujoh is the daughter of Jotaro Kujo and an unknown American woman. Framed for a DUI homicide, she is sent to Green Dolphin Street Prison, where she investigates and battles Dio's most trusted disciple, Father Enrico Pucci. Initially bitter against Jotaro for being absent during her childhood, it becomes her priority to recover his memories and Stand after they are stolen. Her Stand is Stone Free (ストーン・フリー, Sutōn Furī), (Note: "Stone Ocean" in official English releases.) which allows her to turn her body into an elastic but relatively fragile thread. However, when the thread is tightly coiled together, she can create a much more durable and powerful humanoid Stand. She later dies protecting Emporio, but manages to cut Enrico's right eye in the process. After Emporio defeats Pucci, he meets a reincarnation of her named Irene, who also carries the Joestar birthmark.
In Japanese, she is voiced by Fairouz Ai in the anime and subsequent appearances, and Miyuki Sawashiro in All Star Battle and Eyes of Heaven. In English, she is voiced by Kira Buckland.
Enrico Pucci (エンリコ・プッチ, Enriko Putchi)
Enrico Pucci is the main antagonist of Stone Ocean and a loyal follower of Dio, having met him in the 1980s while on the path of priesthood at the age of fifteen and received an Arrow from him. Pucci would later learn of his twin brother Wes and that he is dating their younger sister Perla, his attempt to break them up ending up in causing her death. It was at that time that Pucci acquired his Stand Whitesnake (ホワイトスネイク, Howaitosuneiku), (Note: "Pale Snake" in official English releases.) who can steal a person's Stands and memories in the form of compact discs that can be freely inserted into other people and objects. Enrico sought out Dio and learned of his plans of creating "heaven on earth", retrieving one of Dio's finger bones to carry out Dio's plan should he die. Placing himself in Green Dolphin Street Prison, stealing Jotaro's memories to execute Dio's vision, Pucci arranged events to create the Green Baby and then absorb it for his Stand to undergo an evolution into the gravity-manipulating C-Moon (Note: "See Moon" in official English releases.) once at Cape Canaveral. Enrico uses his Stand's ability to complete its evolution into Made in Heaven (メイド・イン・ヘブン, Meido in Hebun), (Note: "Maiden Heaven" in official English releases.) which can accelerate time up to and past a Big Crunch while preserving all living organisms and prohibiting the souls of the dead from reincarnating. The final result of Made in Heaven's time acceleration is a universe where all surviving organisms have subconscious precognition of their destiny, which he believes to be heaven. While he killed Jolyne and the others, Pucci is killed by Emporio during a second acceleration of time before his new universe can be made permanent, creating a new universe without the precognitive effects of its previous iteration. Made in Heaven was previously named "Stairway to Heaven" (天国への階段(ステアウェイ・トゥ・ヘブン), Suteawei Tu Hebun) in the serialization, but was later changed in the tankōbon volumes.
In Japanese, he is voiced by Tomokazu Seki and Tomoe Hanba (child) in the anime and subsequent appearances, Jouji Nakata in All Star Battle, and Show Hayami in Eyes of Heaven. In English, he is voiced by Yong Yea and Anjali Kunapaneni (child).
Emporio Alniño (エンポリオ・アルニーニョ, Enporio Arunīnyo)
Emporio Alniño is an 11-year-old Cuban-American child, born inside the Green Dolphin prison. He seeks to avenge his mother, who was murdered by Pucci, and has an edge due to Pucci knowing nothing about his existence. He is always seen wearing a baseball uniform and cap, resembling those worn by the Chicago Cubs. His non-combat Stand, Burning Down the House (バーニング・ダウン・ザ・ハウス, Bāningu Daun Za Hausu), (Note: "Burn the House Down" in official English Releases.) can manipulate, see, and use ghostly objects. He sympathizes with Jolyne and becomes one of her most crucial allies. Emporio eventually succeeds in killing Enrico Pucci using Weather Report's Stand, and lives on in the new universe as the lone witness to Jolyne's story.
In Japanese, he is voiced by Atsumi Tanezaki in the anime and subsequent appearances, and Junko Kitanishi in Eyes of Heaven. In English, he is voiced by Casey Mongillo.
Ermes Costello (エルメェス・コステロ, Erumēsu Kosutero)
Ermes Costello is Jolyne's friend in prison. When she was 17, her older sister allowed herself to be spotted by a homicidal car salesman named Sports Maxx, subsequently saving Ermes from his wrath, but ending her own life in the process. Enraged, Ermes deliberately had herself arrested in an effort to track Sports Maxx down. Her Stand, Kiss (キッス, Kissu), (Note: "Smack" in official English releases.) is a humanoid-like Stand covered in stickers depicting a woman's lips. Using the stickers will duplicate an item perfectly for as long as the sticker is on it. When the sticker is removed, the original item and the duplicate will violently smash into each other and fuse back together, leaving the original object damaged. Ermes is killed in the final battle with Pucci, but Emporio meets a hitchhiker with her appearance and personality after Pucci's defeat.
In Japanese, she is voiced by Mutsumi Tamura in the anime and subsequent appearances, and Chizu Yonemoto in All Star Battle and Eyes of Heaven. In English, she is voiced by Tiana Camacho.
Weather Report (ウェザー・リポート, Wezā Ripōto) (Note: "Weather Forecast" in official English releases.)
Weather Report is an amnesiac prisoner who allies himself with Jolyne and seeks his memory back after Father Enrico Pucci took it. Weather was originally born as "Domenico Pucci" (ドメニコ・プッチ, Domeniko Putchi) to the wealthy Pucci family, being the younger twin brother of Enrico Pucci. He was stolen from the clinic nursery by a woman whose own baby had died soon after birth on the same day. He lived as Wes Bluemarine (ウェス・ブルーマリン, Wesu Burūmarin), until Pucci met the kidnapper at a confessional and found out that they were brothers. Pucci hired detectives to separate Wes from their sister, Perla, whom he had been dating. Unbeknownst to Pucci, the detectives he hired were part of the Ku Klux Klan, and seeing Wes' stepfather was a black man, assumed he was of mixed race. They lynched him and seemingly killed him, prompting Perla to commit suicide. Wes survived and killed the racist detectives with his newly-awakened Stand, Weather Report. Pucci used his own Stand to remove Wes's memories. With no memory of his past or name, Wes adopted the name of his Stand, and eventually ended up in Green Dolphin Street Prison. He regained his memories later in the part thanks to Donatello Versace's Stand, Underworld. This unlocks both his true, more cocky and sinister personality, as well as his Stand's true potential - an ability named Heavy Weather (ヘビー・ウェザー, Hebī Wezā) that creates rainbows which use subliminal messages to make anyone seeing them transform into snails. He is consumed by rage against Pucci, suicidally attempting to kill him. Weather is eventually killed by Pucci, but not before using Whitesnake to turn his Stand into a disc, which eventually becomes the key to Pucci's downfall. After Pucci's defeat, Emporio and the reincarnations of his friends offer a ride to a hitchhiker with a striking resemblance to him.
In Japanese, he is voiced by Yūichirō Umehara in the anime and subsequent appearances, and Tōru Ōkawa in Eyes of Heaven. In English, he is voiced by Stephen Fu.
Narciso Anasui (ナルシソ・アナスイ, Narushiso Anasui) (Note: "Narcisco Anastasia" in official English releases.)
Anasui is an androgynous inmate placed in Green Dolphin Street Prison for murdering his girlfriend, who was having an affair with another man. He falls in love with Jolyne to an obsessive degree, believing that he would be able to "purify" himself both by courting and marrying her, and helping her defeat Pucci. Anasui wields the Stand Diver Down (ダイバー・ダウン, Daibā Daun), (Note: "Diver Drive" in official English releases.) which allows him to enter objects and restructure their insides. He ultimately sacrifices himself in the final battle with Pucci to warn Jotaro of Made in Heaven's attack. After Emporio defeats Pucci, Emporio meets a reincarnation of him named Anakiss, who is engaged to Jolyne's reincarnation with plans to marry.
In Japanese, he is voiced by Daisuke Namikawa in the anime and subsequent appearances, and Yuichi Nakamura in All Star Battle and Eyes of Heaven. In English, he is voiced by Howard Wang.
Foo Fighters (フー・ファイターズ, Fū Faitāzu)
Foo Fighters, commonly referred to as F.F., (Note: The nickname is her only name in official English releases.) is a fusion of a colony of plankton and a Stand of the same name, created by Enrico Pucci to guard Jotaro's Stand Disc. But upon being defeated by Jolyne, Foo Fighters allies with her out of gratitude, possessing the corpse of a prisoner named Atroe (エートロ, Ētoro). F.F sacrifices herself for Narciso, preferring death with her memories over being remade as a new being with no sentience. While referenced as female in Japanese media, Foo Fighters is referred to with non-binary pronouns in the anime's English dub.
In Japanese, she is voiced by Mariya Ise. In English, she is voiced by Brittany Lauda.
Donatello Versus (ドナテロ・ヴェルサス, Donatero Verusasu)
Donatello is one of Dio's illegitimate sons, and the half-brother of Ungalo, Rikiel, and Giorno Giovanna, who fatefully meets Enrico Pucci. His Stand, Under World (アンダー・ワールド, Andā Wārudo), (Note: "Netherworld" in official English releases.) can resurrect the memories of people, things, or events from the ground. After failing to eliminate Ermes Costello and Jolyne in the memory of a plane crash, Versus betrays Pucci by stealing Weather Report's memory disc. Afterward, Versus seeks Jotaro's memory disc in an attempt to claim Pucci's destiny, but is eventually cornered by Jolyne and Ermes and forced to drive to Weather and Pucci's location. In the ensuing chaos, Versus is used as a decoy by an escaping Pucci before being killed by Anasui.
In Japanese, he is voiced by Takanori Hoshino. In English, he is voiced by Isaac Robinson Smith.

=== Part 7: Steel Ball Run ===
Set in a rebooted universe in post-Civil War America circa 1890.

Johnny Joestar (ジョニィ・ジョースター, Jonī Jōsutā)
Johnny Joestar is the main protagonist of Steel Ball Run. Born in Kentucky and spending some time in the United Kingdom, Johnny was a horse racing prodigy until an altercation left him paralyzed from the waist down. He participates in the Steel Ball Run in order to follow Gyro Zeppeli and learn how to use the Spin, as it is the only thing that has made him able to stand on his own again. Johnny races on the horse Slow Dancer (スロー・ダンサー, Surō Dansā) and eventually develops the Stand Tusk (タスク, Tasuku), at first allowing him to shoot his fingernails at people, but it soon evolves through a series of Acts. With Act 2 he imparts his fingernails with the Spin, allowing him to move the holes his fingernails produce. Act 3 allows Johnny to teleport parts of himself through the holes after he shoots himself with an Act 2 fingernail. The final form of Act 4 is the most powerful offensive Stand in the part, allowing Johnny to trap whoever his nail hits in a constant loop during which they cannot leave where they were located at the time of the attack until the Spin is stopped by Johnny, or else they will eventually be killed by the Super Spin literally unraveling their DNA; Act 4's physical form is also so strong that it can bend reality itself, ripping apart the barriers between dimensions to travel to alternate timelines or peeling the layers of his own dimension. In JoJolion, Johnny is revealed to have married a Japanese woman named Rina Higashikata with the Higashikata Family as his descendants alongside Joseph "Fumi" Joestar and the universe's version of Yoshikage Kira.
In Japanese, he is voiced by Shogo Sakata in the anime, and Yuki Kaji in Eyes of Heaven and All-Star Battle. In English, he is voiced by Daman Mills.
Lucy Steel (ルーシー・スティール, Rūshī Sutīru)
Lucy Steel is a fourteen-year-old girl who tries to help Johnny and Gyro, and is married to the Steel Ball Run promoter Stephen Steel. She eventually obtains the Stand Ticket to Ride (涙の乗車券(チケット・ゥ・ライド), Chiketto u Raido) that offers her a form of divine protection. In Jojolion, an elderly Lucy became an agent of the Speedwagon Foundation and encounters Fumi while investigating the Higashikata Family in 1941.
In Japanese, she is voiced by Rie Takahashi. In English, she is voiced by Frankie Kevich.
Funny Valentine (ファニー・ヴァレンタイン, Fanī Varentain)
Funny Valentine is the main antagonist of Steel Ball Run, and a dishonorably discharged American soldier who became the 23rd President of the United States. His ultimate goal is to reassemble the Saint's Corpse and use its power for world dominion, using the corpse's heart to gain the Stand Dirty Deeds Done Dirt Cheap (Dirty Deeds Done Dirt Cheap(いともたやすく行われるえげつない行為), Dātī Dīzu Dan Dāto Chīpu (Itomo Tayasuku Okonawareru Egetsunai Kōi)) or D4C for short. (Note: In official English releases, "D4C" is the Stand's only name, with its long form officially claimed to be unknown. Instances of the full name in dialogue are instead replaced with a synonymic phrase, such as "Time to perform some filthy acts at a fair and reasonable price!") D4C enables Valentine to travel between alternate dimensions by being pressed between two objects and transfer his mind into another version of himself, usually as a means to cheat death. The Stand also enables Valentine to summon others from alternate realities, though only he and his counterparts are immune to the usual demise of two iterations of the same person annihilating each other in the form of Menger sponges upon physical contact.
In Japanese, he is voiced by Tomokazu Sugita in the anime, and Yasuyuki Kase in All-Star Battle and Eyes of Heaven.
Diego Brando (ディエゴ・ブランドー, Diego Burandō)
Diego Brando, nicknamed Dio, is a British racer in the Steel Ball Run, riding the horse Silver Bullet (シルバーバレット, Shirubā Baretto). He is initially just a rival to Gyro and Johnny, but allies himself with Valentine and grows to hate them. After being subject to the Stand of Dr. Ferdinand, Diego acquires one of the Saint Corpse's eyes and obtains the Stand Scary Monsters (恐竜(スケアリー・モンスター), Sukearī Monsutā), (Note: "Frightening Monsters" in official English releases.) allowing him to transform into a dinosaur at will, as well as transform other living beings into dinosaurs or fossilize them. After he turns on the president, attempting to assassinate him, and dies, Valentine uses D4C to bring another Diego Brando into this iteration of reality. This alternate Diego possesses the Stand The World, which functions the same as its original universe counterpart.
In Japanese, he is voiced by Kaito Ishikawa in the anime, and Takehito Koyasu in Eyes of Heaven and All-Star Battle. In English, he is voiced by Damien Haas.
Gyro Zeppeli (ジャイロ・ツェペリ, Jairo Tseperi)
Gyro Zeppeli is a disgraced magistrate and executioner from the Kingdom of Naples, who participates in the Steel Ball Run to free someone who he believes has been wrongly imprisoned, racing on his horse Valkyrie (ヴァルキリー, Varukirī). Gyro is a master of a mystical art called the Spin, which is channeled through Steel Balls and is the art of imparting the knowledge of the Golden rectangle into throwing the Steel Balls, causing the Spin to be transferred from the ball to the target. It has both healing and offensive properties, as the Zeppeli family has used the Spin in both their medical practice and in their work as executioners for the church. Gyro later develops an ability called Scan (スキャン, Sukyan) when one of his Steel Balls is imparted with a piece of the Saint's Corpse. Scan gives Gyro the ability to look inside people, making his Spin's attacks even more deadly. With the power of the Super Spin, accessed by having Valkyrie run at a fast enough speed to make everything incorporate the Golden rectangle, he develops the Stand Ball Breaker (ボール・ブレイカー, Bōru Bureikā), which, when a Steel Ball hits its mark, causes the vast energies kept by the Spin to accelerate the life of cells in the target so much so that the cells die. Gyro's real name is Julius Caesar Zeppeli ((ユーリウス・カイザー・ツェペリ, Yūriusu Kaizā Tseperi).
In Japanese, he is voiced by Yōhei Azakami in the anime, and Shin-ichiro Miki in Eyes of Heaven and All-Star Battle. In English, he is voiced by Kaiji Tang.
Sandman (砂男(サンドマン), Sandoman)
Sandman was a member of a Native American tribe, from which he had become ostracized from for embracing the "white man's" culture. He believes that the only way to stop the encroachment of his tribe's land is to play by the settlers' rules, thus he enters the Steel Ball Run race hoping to use the prize money to buy back his ancestor's land and protect his tribe. During the fight against Johnny Joestar and Gyro Zeppeli, Gyro uses his newfound Golden Rectangle technique to injure the overconfident Sandman, leading to his death. He uses the Stand called In a Silent Way (イン・ア・サイレント・ウェイ, In A Sairento Wei), (Note: "Silent Ways" in official English releases.) which is able to store sounds in objects and activate their corresponding effect when touched, similar to Echoes Act 2 from the original universe. Sandman's real name is Soundman (サウンドマン, Saundoman), with the former being a mispronunciation used by white settlers.
In Japanese, he is voiced by Masaaki Mizunaka. In English, he is voiced by Alejandro Antonio Ruiz.

=== Part 8: JoJolion ===
The series follows the rebooted timeline from Steel Ball Run, with the story taking place immediately after the 2011 Tōhoku earthquake and tsunami.

Josuke Higashikata (東方 定助, Higashikata Jōsuke)
The main protagonist of JoJolion, he was originally Josefumi Kujo (空条 仗世文, Kūjō Josefumi), a young man who was friends with his universe's version of Yoshikage Kira. When he helped Kira steal a branch of the Locacaca Tree for his mother Holly, it resulted in Kira being fatally wounded before he and Josefumi were buried alive by the 2011 Tōhoku earthquake and tsunami. The properties of the New Locacaca Fruit they created caused Josefumi to acquire parts of Kira's physical and genetic traits and effectively become a fusion of the two, an entirely different person with no memory of his past. He is found and named "Josuke" by Yasuho Hirose, who brings him into the care of the Higashikata family. When Josuke learns of his origins, he suffers an existential crisis until deciding to honor his components' intentions to save Holly and track down the New Locacaca.
Josuke possesses the Stand Soft & Wet (ソフト＆ウェット, Sofuto Ando Wetto), which allows him to produce bubbles that, upon contact with an object, can steal an aspect of the object that can then be used for other purposes, such as a person's eyesight or the friction of the floor. Josuke is also able to freely control the size of these bubbles, creating small ones when he needs to steal something discretely or bigger ones when he needs to steal larger things, up to and including entire people. His bubbles are actually soft, spinning lines; thus revealing that his Stand is related to the Spin. Combined with Killer Queen's ability to create bombs, this unlocks a new ability called Soft & Wet: Go Beyond (S&W(ソフトアンドウェット) 越えて行く, Sofuto Ando Wetto: Gō Biyondo), which creates explosive bubbles that can pass through any barrier, including Wonder of U's Flow of Calamity. Kira is the great-great-grandson of Johnny Joestar, making Josuke the great-great-grandson of Johnny by proxy.
Yasuho Hirose (広瀬 康穂, Hirose Yasuho)
Yasuho is a young woman who discovers Josuke buried in the ground and helps him throughout the search for his true identity, and later helps him search for the Locacaca. Her Stand is Paisley Park (ペイズリー・パーク, Peizurī Pāku), (Note: "Flower Park" in official English releases.) which has the ability to "direct" things around Yasuho, although it often acts on Yasuho's subconscious needs rather than her being able to directly control it. Later gaining slightly better control over her Stand, Yasuho is eventually able to use Paisley Park to directly interface with different types of electronic devices and gather data from them.
Rai Mamezuku (豆銑 礼, Mamezuku Rai)
A man who is the Higashikata family's private fruit grower and appraiser. After being tracked down and attacked by a hostile Stand user due to his affiliations with the Higashikata family, Mamezuku decides to meet up with Josuke and Yasuho for help, eventually joining the two in their search for the Locacaca. His Stand is Doggy Style (ドギー・スタイル, Dogī Sutairu), which enables him to unravel his body into prehensile ribbon-like wires, not only increasing his range but also increasing his durability to certain forms of attacks. He knows the Spin, and is the one who revealed the secret within Josuke's stand.
Norisuke Higashikata IV (四代目東方憲助, Yondaime Higashikata Norisuke)
The current head of the Higashikata family, and owner of the Higashikata Fruit Company. In the hopes of helping his family find a cure for the Higashikata Family Curse, a disease that gradually petrifies the firstborn male of every generation, he adopts Josuke Higashikata to help him recover his memories, as he knew that Josuke was searching for a cure in his past life. His Stand is King Nothing (キング・ナッシング, Kingu Nasshingu), (Note: "King of Nothingness" in official English releases.) which is able to break down into jigsaw pieces, and track a specific person or object with their scent.
Jobin Higashikata (東方 常敏, Higashikata Jōbin)
A major antagonist of the part, he is the eldest son of Norisuke, and the heir to the Higashikata Fruit Company. Jobin worked with Tamaki Damo's Locacaca Smuggling Organization to launder money for them, in the hopes of taking one of the fruits to cure his family from the Higashikata Curse, and elevate their place in society. Jobin is willing to push his family to the top by any means necessary, even resorting to murder. His stand is Speed King (スピード・キング, Supīdo Kingu), which has the ability to store heat in any object it touches, which can become as hot as 300 °C, and can be transferred to humans who touch such objects, with the possibility of being lethal. Alternatively, he can simply use Speed King to touch humans, and heat them directly, which can place them in heat strokes, or worse.
Toru (透龍, Tōru)
Toru is the main antagonist of JoJolion, who is introduced in the Doctor Wu and Awaking 3 Leaves story arc. He is portrayed as Yasuho Hirose's ex-boyfriend from high school and a part-time worker at TG University Hospital with ties to the hospital's head doctor, Satoru Akefu. It is revealed later that Akefu is an alias for Toru's Stand Wonder of U (ワンダー・オブ・U(ユー), Wandā Obu Yū), and that he is the true mastermind behind the activities of the Rock Humans. His main goal is to obtain the New Locacaca, causing him to clash with Josuke and the Higashikata family. Wonder of U causes anyone who attempts to pursue him or his stand to suffer "calamities", spontaneous freak accidents via objects crashing into them with disproportionate force (A cigarette butt has enough force to pierce someone's hand). It is revealed near the end of Part 8 that his Stand only manipulated the "laws of calamity" towards those who pursued him, and that it was a force of nature itself. After Toru's death, Wonder of U continued to attack Norisuke IV until being destroyed by Josuke using Soft & Wet: Go Beyond.

=== Part 9: The JoJoLands ===
The series follows the rebooted timeline from Steel Ball Run and JoJolion, with the story taking place in Oahu, Hawaii, sometime in the early 2020s.

Jodio Joestar (ジョディオ・ジョースター, Jodio Jōsutā)
Jodio Joestar is a 15-year-old gangster living with his family on Oahu, Hawaii, where he acts as a gofer for the state's underground drug trade. Using his stand, November Rain (11月の雨(ノーベンバー・レイン), Nōbenbā Rein), Jodio can create raindrops with crushing force. Despite his popularity among his peers and his outward persona, he suffers from Antisocial personality disorder and finds it difficult to be truly happy.
Dragona Joestar (ドラゴナ・ジョースター, Doragona Jōsutā)
Dragona Joestar is Jodio's 18-year-old brother. (Note: Attributed to multiple sources:) Aside from operating in their gang, Dragona works in a fashion boutique. Despite being born male, they are fascinated with femininity to the point they take breast enlargement injections to fit into women's clothing more naturally. Their Stand, Smooth Operators (スムース・オペレイターズ, Sumūsu Opereitāzu), consists of small robots capable of displacing anything.
Paco Laburantes (パコ・ラブランテス, Pako Raburantesu)
Paco Laburantes is a 19-year-old classmate of Jodio's, and part of their gang. He comes from an abusive household, having one of his ears partially bitten off by his father, and engages in thievery as if it were a sport. His stand, The Hustle (THEハッスル, Za Hassuru), is capable of bulging his muscles to grab onto objects without using his hands, allowing him to make impressive sleights of hand.
Usagi Aloha'oe (ウサギ・アロハオエ, Usagi Arohaoe)
Usagi Aloha'oe is a 17-year-old classmate of Jodio's, who takes part in stealing the diamond under Meryl Me Qi's request. He is also one of Meryl's most frequent customers, causing his other accomplices to rule him off as an addict and a hindrance. In Act 2, it is revealed that he never had any friends growing up, and was sent to a correctional institution and disowned by his mother after he came out as bisexual. Using his stand, The Matte Kudasai, he can use an existing object to transform into what someone else wants it to be, excluding his own wishes.
Meryl Me Qi (メリル・メイ・チー, Meriru Mei Chī)
Meryl Me Qi is the principal of Jodio's school and owner of a fashion boutique, who is also the boss of Jodio and his classmates. She instructs them to steal a diamond from a then unknown Japanese tourist visiting the islands.
Barbara Ann Joestar (バーバラ・アン・ジョースター, Bābara An Jōsutā)
Barbara Ann Joestar is the mother of Jodio and Dragona Joestar. Due to the support of her sons, everyone respects her and assists her when needed. She is the sister of Holy Joestar-Kira, Yoshikage Kira’s mother from JoJolion.
Rohan Kishibe (岸辺 露伴, Kishibe Rohan)
Rohan Kishibe is a successful Japanese manga artist visiting Hawaii for a 15-day vacation. Jodio and his classmates are tasked with stealing the diamond from his villa. Unlike other Part 7-9 counterparts to the original universe, Rohan's appearance is identical to his prior incarnation. Like his original counterpart, his stand is Heaven's Door (ヘブンズ・ドアー, Hebunzu Doā), which can peel a person's skin open to reveal pages of a book underneath, showing the person's memories and personality.
Charming Man (チャーミング・マン, Chāmingu Man)
Charming Man is a secondary ally initially introduced as an antagonist attempting to steal the Lava Rock from Jodio's group. It is later revealed that Charming Man has a younger brother named Mauka that has been sucked into the lava tube of the Hualālai volcano from where the Lava Rock originates, hence his interest for it. Charming Man wields the stand Bigmouth Strikes Again (ビッグマウス・ストライクス・アゲイン, Biggumausu Sutoraikusu Agein), that allows him to use a layer of his skin to blend with his surroundings, change his appearance, and hide weapons.
Hacca Howler (アッカ・ハウラー, Akka Haurā)

Hacca Howler (Acca) is the main antagonist of The Jojolands and the eighth head of the infrastructure developing HOWLER Company, which owns Hualālai's northern slope. He's pulled into the plot by Team Jodio's plans to steal the deeds to his land, and subsequently his entire fortune. His Stand is named Eclipse Eight (エクリプス8(エイト), Ekuripusu Eitō), that has an ability that can teleport any object by covering it in mist.
