= Buyeri, Kohgiluyeh and Boyer-Ahmad =

Buyeri بويري
- Village
- Location within Iran
- Coordinates: 30°39′08″N 50°30′10″E
- Country: Iran
- Province: Kohgiluyeh and Boyer-Ahmad
- County: Kohgiluyeh
- Bakhsh: Central
- Rural District: Dehdasht-e Gharbi

Population (2006)
  - Total: 156
- Time zone: UTC+3:30 (IRST)
  - Summer (DST): UTC+4:30 (IRDT)

Buyeri (Persian: بويري, also Romanized as Būyerī) is a village in Dehdasht-e Gharbi Rural District, in the Central District of Kohgiluyeh County, Kohgiluyeh and Boyer-Ahmad Province, Iran. At the 2006 census, its population was 156, in 35 families.
