= Araby (Mason's Springs, Maryland) =

Historic house in Maryland

- U.S. National Register of Historic Places
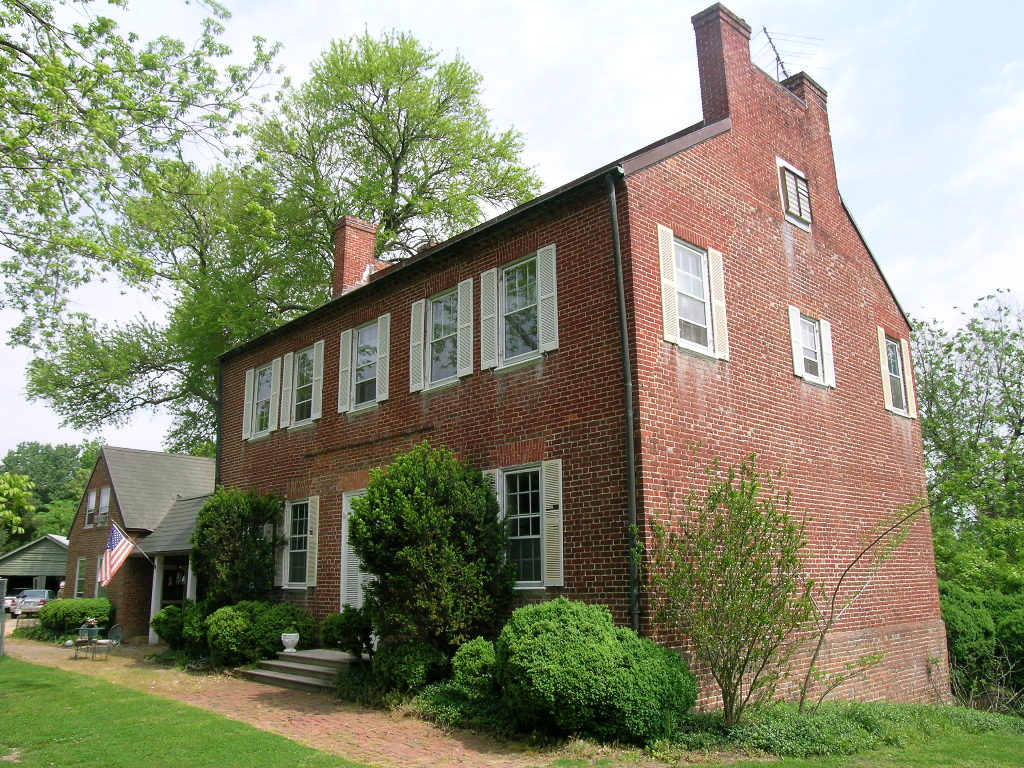
- Araby in 2005

- Location within Maryland Location within the United States
- Location: SE of Mason on MD 425, Mason's Springs, Maryland
- Coordinates: 38°34′43″N 77°6′54″W
- Area: 74 acres (30 ha)
- Architectural style: Federal
- NRHP reference No.: 74000947
- Added to NRHP: July 25, 1974

Araby is a historic house located near Mason Springs, Charles County, Maryland. An example of Federal architecture, it was built in the mid-1700s and underwent extensive renovations a hundred years later. Much of the house remains unaltered from that time. Araby is located on private property and is not accessible to the general public.

Merchant William Eilbeck built the plantation house, where he lived with his wife Sarah. He was one of the wealthiest men in Charles County, and held the rank of colonel in the local militia, and by 1745 was one of the gentleman justices of the local court. Eilbeck also had another plantation nearby, but only one child, a daughter Anne. In 1750, planter George Mason married Anne. The young couple lived with the Eilbecks while constructing Gunston Hall on his Virginia estates, and continued to visit Araby from time to time. Another of Anne's former suitors, George Washington, who owned a nearby property, was a frequent visitor. Sarah Eilbeck survived her husband, so Araby did not pass to their third grandson William Mason (1757-1820) until her death in 1780, when he was 23 and an officer in the Fairfax militia.

It was listed on the National Register of Historic Places in 1974. There is a historic marker on MD 225 south.
