= Elaraby =

Elaraby (Arabic: العربي) is an Egyptian surname. Notable people with the surname include:

- Nabil Elaraby (1935–2024), Egyptian politician and diplomat
- Rowan Elaraby (born 2000), Egyptian squash player
