= Arabuyeh =

Arabuyeh عربويه
- Village
- Location within Iran
- Coordinates: 29°01′55″N 54°34′21″E
- Country: Iran
- Province: Fars
- County: Neyriz
- Bakhsh: Central
- Rural District: Horgan

Population (2006)
  - Total: 99
- Time zone: UTC+3:30 (IRST)
  - Summer (DST): UTC+4:30 (IRDT)

Arabuyeh (Persian: عربويه, also Romanized as 'Arabūyeh; also known as 'Arabī, Araboo, 'Arabū, and 'Arbeh) is a village in Horgan Rural District, in the Central District of Neyriz County, Fars province, Iran. At the 2006 census, its population was 99, in 24 families.
