= James Charles (painter) =

British artist

- Born: 5 January 1851; Warrington, Lancashire
- Died: 27 August 1906 (aged 55); Llandyrnog, Denbighshire
- Education: Heatherleys, RA, Julien

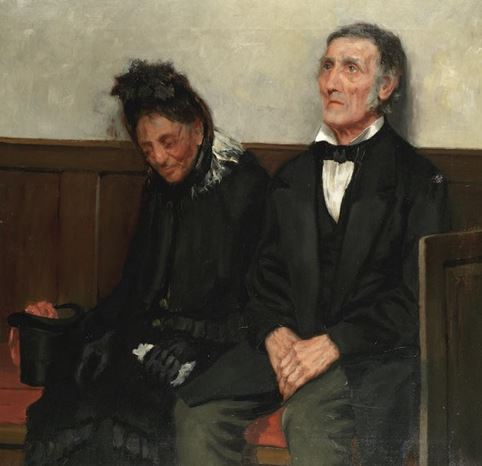
Darby and Joan

James Charles (5 January 1851 – 27 August 1906) was a British impressionist artist.

== Life ==
Charles, born at Warrington, Lancashire, in January 1851, came of a family, originally French, who were long settled in Carnarvon, and owned fishing and cargo boats trading with Anglesey. His father, Richard Charles, was a draughtsman and cabinet maker, who designed the mayor of Carnarvon's chain of office, now in the town hall, where also hangs his portrait painted by his son.

As a lad of fourteen, James Charles accompanied his father to London, where he received a desultory education while working in his father's office. He was employed for some time at a lithographer's, then studied at Heatherley School of Fine Art in Newman Street, and finally entered the Royal Academy School in 1872.

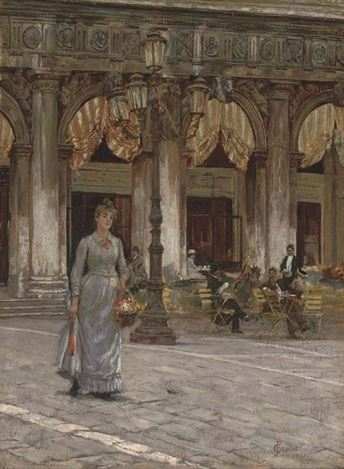
Cafe Chioggia, Piazza San Marco, Venice

Marrying and settling in 1875 at 15 Halsey Street, Chelsea, Charles exhibited his first picture at the Royal Academy, "An Italian Youth in Armour", and sold it on the opening day. In 1876 he had four pictures in the Academy, including his father's portrait, and in 1877 three portraits, one being of Victor Cavendish the present duke of Devonshire, and his brother as children; from this date to 1904 he was yearly represented by one to four pictures.

Charles also exhibited at the Grosvenor Gallery. In 1879 he was introduced to a picture collector of Bradford, John Maddocks, who appreciated his work, and henceforward not only purchased many of his canvases himself, but made him known in Bradford and the north of England, where he established a lasting and profitable connection.

Charles exhibited at the newly formed New English Art Club.

From 1877 onwards Charles painted a good deal, first at Thorpacre near Loughborough, Leicestershire, and subsequently at South Halting, Petersfield, Sussex, where his subject pictures included "Christening Sunday" (R.A. 1887), now in the Manchester Art Gallery; the landscape "The Lost Cap" (was purchased by McCulloch Collection); "The Village Post Office" (Johannesburg Art Gallery); and "Will it Rain ?" (Tate Gallery). Between 1889 and 1895 he lived at Colnor House, Bosham, Chichester, where he painted "Milking Time," a sunny landscape with cattle (now in the National Gallery of Victoria), and "Signing the Marriage Register" (R.A. 1895; now in Cartwright Hall Art Gallery, Bradford). In 1896 he moved to East Ashling House, Chichester, and engaged in pictures of rustic life.

Charles, who had spent two previous seasons in the Paris studios, visited Venice in 1891, and in the same year was elected an associate of the Societe Nationale des Beaux Arts in Paris. In 1896 he produced "The Chalk Pit", and a year or two later "Souvenir of Watteau", a fine work in chiaroscuro (now in the Johannesburg Gallery), "In Spring Time", and many landscapes. The two darkest months of every year he now devoted to Yorkshire, where he undertook many family and presentation portraits. The summer months of 1902 and 1904 were passed at Montreuil-sur-Mer, where some of his most charming coast- and sea-scapes were painted. During the winter of 1905 he was at Capri. Appointed judge at the Carnarvon Eisteddfod in August 1906, he underwent an operation for appendicitis whilst staying at Plas Bennett, Denbigh, in the vale of Clwyd, and died there on 27 Aug. 1906; he was buried in Fulham cemetery.

In 1907, after his death, some of Charles's work was shown in the winter exhibition of the Royal Academy, and the sale of seventy-six of his remaining works at the Leicester Gallery produced about £3,000. In addition to the art galleries named, those of Warrington and Dublin also possess examples of his work.

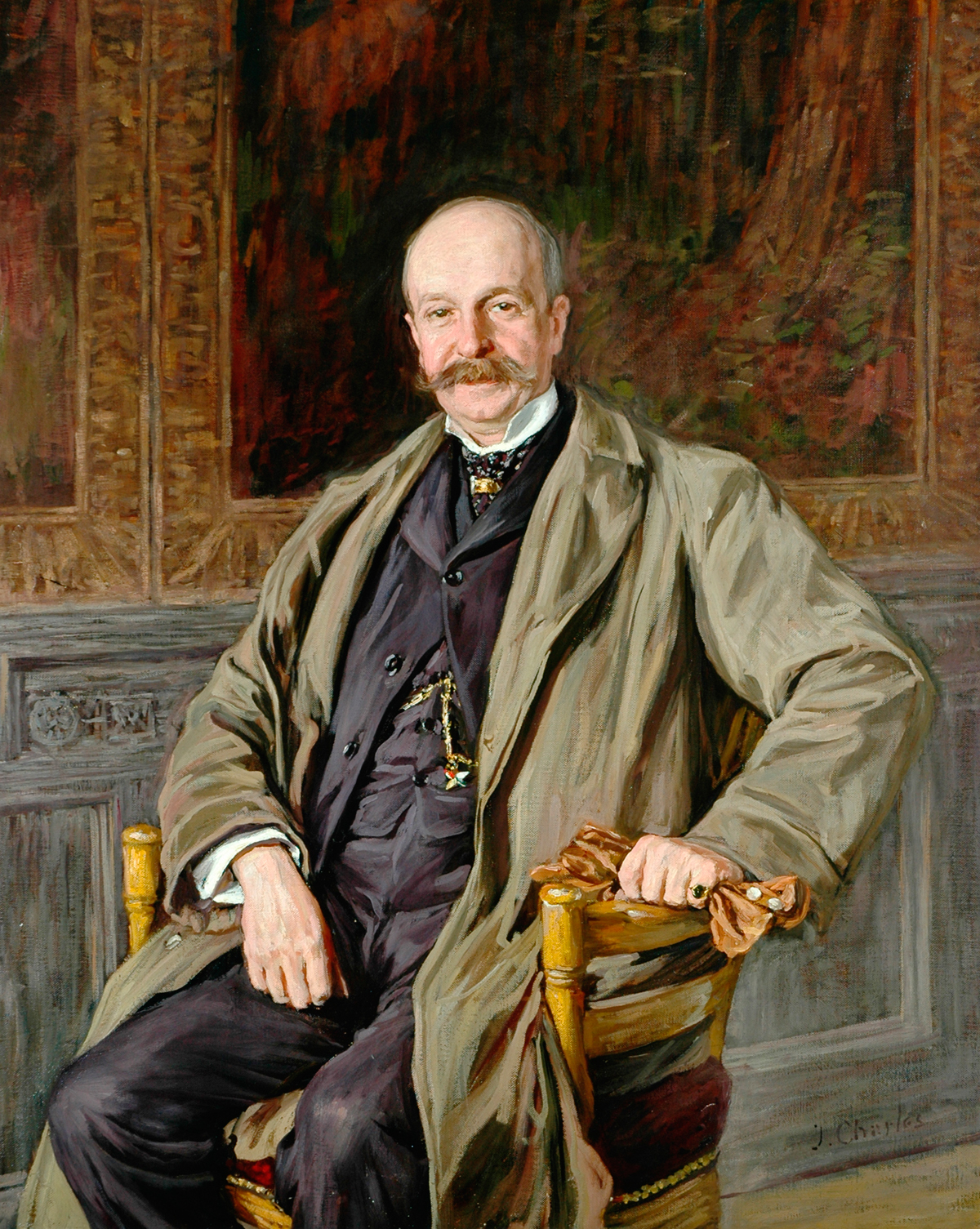
Sir John Arthur Godwin (1852-1921) First Lord Mayor of Bradford

== Family ==
In January 1875 Charles married at the pro-cathedral, Kensington, Ellen Agnes Williams (died 1909) with whom he had five sons and seven daughters. In 1908 a civil list pension of £70. was granted to his widow.

== Legacy ==
Charles has 63 paintings in public collections in the United Kingdom.
