= Darby and Joan =

British expression for a happily married couple

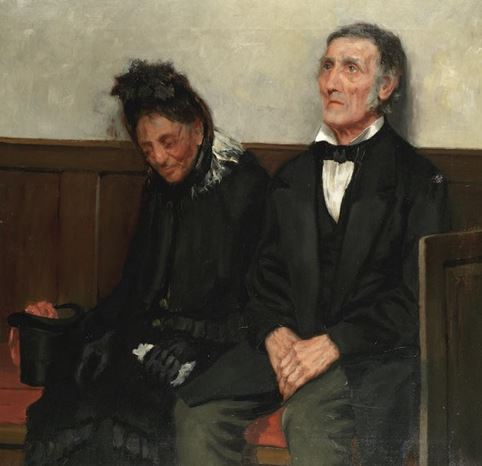
Darby and Joan, a painting by James Charles (c. 1890)

Darby and Joan is a proverbial phrase for a married couple content to share a quiet life of mutual devotion.

== Usage ==
The Nuttall Encyclopædia defined the phrase as "a married couple celebrated for their mutual attachment", the Random House Dictionary as "a happily married couple who lead a placid, uneventful life." The Reader's Encyclopedia mentions the "loving, old-fashioned and virtuous" qualities of Darby and Joan.

== Appearances as a poetic conceit ==
John Darby and his wife Joan were first mentioned in print in a poem published in The Gentleman's Magazine by Henry Woodfall (c. 1686–1747) in 1735, original title The Joys of Love never forgot. A Song. Woodfall had been apprentice to Darby, a printer in Bartholomew Close in the Little Britain area of London, who died in 1730. The poem was issued again as a broadsheet in 1748. One stanza of this poem reads:

Old Darby, with Joan by his side
You've often regarded with wonder.
He's dropsical, she is sore-eyed
Yet they're ever uneasy asunder.

The apparent popularity of this poem led to another titled "Darby and Joan" by St. John Honeywood (1763–1798):

When Darby saw the setting sun,
He swung his scythe and home he run,
Sat down, drank off his quart and said,
"My work is done, I'll go to bed."

Lord Byron referred to the old couple in a letter addressed to Francis Hodgson on 8 December 1811:

Master William Harness and I have recommenced a most fiery correspondence; I like him as Euripides liked Agatho, or Darby admired Joan, as much for the past as the present.

Frederic Weatherly mentioned the couple in the Victorian era. His poem "Darby and Joan" concludes with the following:

Hand in hand when our life was May
Hand in hand when our hair is grey
Shadow and sun for every one,
As the years roll on;
Hand in hand when the long night tide
Gently covers us side by side–
Ah! lad, though we know not when,
Love will be with us forever then:
Always the same, Darby my own,
Always the same to your old wife Joan.

They appear also in We Have Loved of Yore from Robert Louis Stevenson's Songs of Travel and Other Verses, published in 1896:

Frost has bound our flowing river,
Snow has whitened all our island brake,
And beside the winter fagot
Joan and Darby doze and dream and wake.
Still, in the river of dreams
Swims the boat of love –
Hark! chimes the falling oar!
And again in winter evens
When on firelight dreaming fancy feeds,
In those ears of aged lovers
Love's own river warbles in the reeds.
Love still the past, O my love!
We have lived of yore,
O, we have loved of yore.

== Appearances in popular music ==
Woodfall's poem was set to music, as a ballad, by the time of the appearance in 1805 of James Plumptre's Collection of Songs, where it was #152 in the first volume.

Oscar Hammerstein II and Jerome Kern's 1937 ballad "The Folks Who Live On the Hill" mentions Darby and Joan:

We'll sit and look at the same old view,
Just we two.
Darby and Joan who used to be Jack and Jill,
The folks who like to be called,
What they have always been called,
"The folks who live on the hill".

The phrase was used satirically by Noël Coward in the song "Bronxville Darby and Joan" from his musical Sail Away (1961). The refrain begins, "We're a dear old couple and we hate one another."

A relatively modern music reference to "Darby and Joan" is found in the 1969 pop release of the same name, written and performed by Lyn "Twinkle" Ripley, an English singer-songwriter.

Another even newer reference is in the 2018 song "Darby and Joan" by Australian band The Babe Rainbow.

== Appearances in prose ==
Oliver Goldsmith refers to Darby and Joan in his 1773 play, She Stoops to Conquer or, The Mistakes of a Night. A Comedy in a conversation between married couple, Hardcastle and Mrs. Hardcastle In Act I, Scene I. Mrs. Hardcastle says, "You may be a Darby, but I'll be no Joan, I promise you."

A reference to Darby and Joan appears in The Memoirs of Harriette Wilson (1825), the well-known courtesan whom the Duke of Wellington famously told to "publish and be damned!" Speaking of her tempestuous love–hate relationship with the "little sugar baker" Richard Meyler, she writes wryly:

Why really, Meyler, this plan of free as air, which you know you proposed, is so decidedly to my taste that I cannot sufficiently express to you my obligation. I began to wish, with you, that there was no such thing as constancy in the world, particularly when I recollect how very Darby and Joan-like we lived together in London.

Herman Melville references Darby and Joan in describing the couple Samoa and Annatoo in Chapter 23 of Mardi (1849):

Very often this husband and wife were no Darby and Joan. Their married life was one long campaign, whereof the truces were only by night.

Darby and Joan appear in William Makepeace Thackeray's The History of Henry Esmond (1852), when the beautiful, spoiled Beatrix taunts Esmond for his seemingly hopeless infatuation with her:

You have not enough money to keep a cat decently after you have your man his wages, and your landlady her bill. Do you think I'm going to live in a lodging, and turn the mutton at a string whilst your honour nurses the baby? Fiddlestick, and why did you not get this nonsense knocked out of your head when you were in the wars? You are come back more dismal and dreary than ever. You and mamma are fit for each other. You might be Darby and Joan, and play cribbage to the end of your lives.

They appear in Anthony Trollope's novel Phineas Finn (Chapter 51, "Troubles at Loughlinter"), published in 1869:

He was disposed to think that the whirlwind had hitherto been too predominant, and had said so very plainly with a good deal of marital authority. This autumn and winter were to be devoted to the cultivation of proper relations between him and his wife. "Does that mean Darby and Joan?" his wife had asked him, when the proposition was made to her.

and there are also several references in Trollope's subsequent The Prime Minister (1876), when Lady Glencora, Duchess of Omnium, bridles at her husband's requests that she put an end to the string of lavish parties she has been throwing to celebrate his selection as the country's leader. She dreads his demand that they adopt what she dismissively describes as a "Darby & Joan" existence.

Other references include Henry James's "The Bostonians" (1885–1886):

Mrs. Luna said, with her sociable manner, 'There is nothing I like so much, of a winter's night, as a cosy tête-à-tête by the fire. It's quite like Darby and Joan; what a pity the kettle has ceased singing!'

and The Golden Bowl (1904):

Their very silence might have been the mark of something grave – their silence eked out for her by his giving her his arm and their then crawling up their steps quite mildly and unitedly together, like some old Darby and Joan who have had a disappointment.

Jerome K. Jerome, in his play The Passing of the Third Floor Back: An Idle Fancy In a Prologue, A Play, and An Epilogue (1908) has a character (Mrs. de Hooley) refer ironically to an argumentative couple (Major and Mrs. Tomkins) as "Darby and Joan."

Wallace Stevens also refers to "young Darby and young Joan" in his essay "Imagination as Value", from his 1951 book of essays, The Necessary Angel.

Ruth Rendell's The Best Man to Die (1981) has this reference:

My father called my mother darling once or twice and there was a kind of Darby and Joan air about them;

Alan Ayckbourn refers to "Darby and Joan Hepplewick" in his 1982 play Intimate Exchanges.

Albert Camus' translator Stuart Gilbert said "they weren't one of those exemplary married couples of the Darby-and-Joan pattern" on page 70 of The Plague (Vintage 1991 edition). Camus did not use the phrase himself in 'La Peste' (1947: 57): "Ce n'etait même pas un de ces ménages qui offrent au monde l'exemple d'un bonheur exemplaire..."

Louisa May Alcott's "Moods" Chapter 14:

Why not, if you can bear our quiet life, for we are a Darby and Joan already, though we do not look so to-night, I acknowledge.

In the novel A History of the World in 10½ Chapters, Julian Barnes refers to the selection of animal pairs to allow on Noah's ark, as "a sort of beauty contest cum brains trust cum Darby-and-Joan event"

== Darby and Joan clubs ==
These were set up by the Women's Voluntary Service (WVS) after World War II. The WVS had done sterling work during the Blitz, and wanted to develop what they could offer to older people. They set up day centres called "Darby and Joan clubs", "where people could meet in pleasant surroundings for a friendly chat and a cup of tea and perhaps a quiet game of cards or half an hour with the wireless [i.e. radio]"; some of these clubs also offered a hot mid-day meal.
