= Cut and restore rope trick =

Magic trick

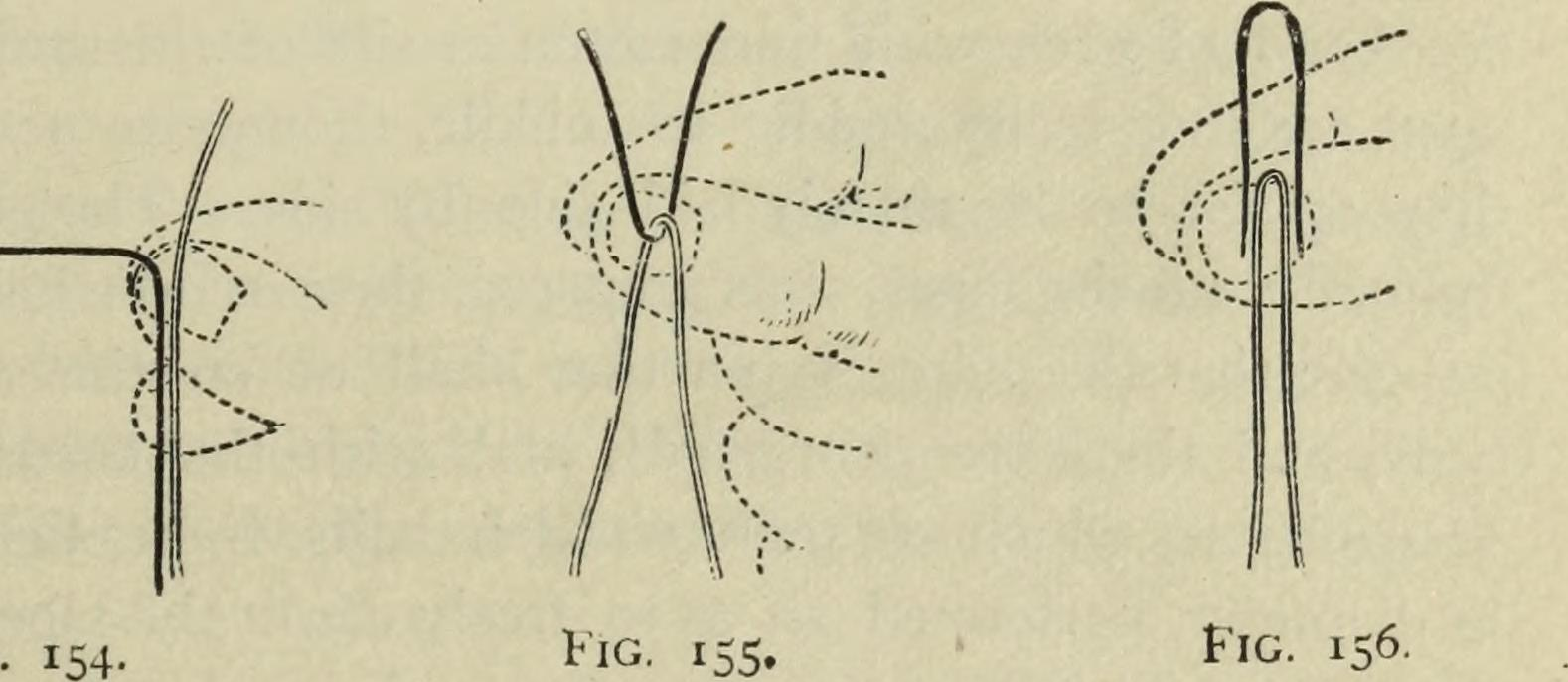
Illustration of "The Cut String Restored" from the 1885 book Modern Magic showing how a second, smaller length of string can be presented as if it were part of the original larger piece

The cut and restore rope trick is a magic effect in which the performer cuts a piece of rope (usually tied into a knot) which then appears to be magically restored. Sometimes the trick is done with a piece of string, a handkerchief, or a turban instead of an actual rope.

A version of this trick appeared in The Discoverie of Witchcraft, first published in 1584, under the name "To cut a lace asunder in the middest, and to make it whole again".

== Method ==
There are many variations on the cut and restore rope trick, but most or all are variations on three basic methods.

The first method uses sleight of hand to make viewers believe the rope is being cut in half, but it is actually cut near the end. The result is a piece of rope nearly as long as the original, and the viewers won't notice the slight change in length.

The second method involves introducing a short piece of rope of the same type as the main rope and cutting that instead. This can be accomplished by many sleight of hand tricks, but attaching it to the main rope, disguised as the loop of a knot, is the most common method. When the performer removes the knot, the original rope is completely uncut.

The third method involves gimmicked ropes that can be rejoined using magnets or another method. Usually, the gimmicked ends of the rope are the original two ends, so each segment is 180 degrees from where it started, with the freshly cut portions on the ends.

The psychological principle behind almost all magic tricks with rope follows the principles of gestalt Psychology. The illusion relies on the audience's inclination to form faulty assumptions that guide their perceptions. Spectators draw wrong conclusions about the configuration of the ropes because the magician can hide the real situation with their hand.
