= Bowheyri =

Village in Bushehr province, Iran

Bowheyri Persian: بوحيري
- Village
- Location within Iran
- Coordinates: 28°35′25″N 51°22′39″E
- Country: Iran
- Province: Bushehr
- County: Dashti
- District: Central
- Rural District: Markazi

Population (2016)
  - Total: 1,070
- Time zone: UTC+3:30 (IRST)

Bowheyri (Persian: بوحيري) (Note: Also romanized as Bowḩeyrī; also known as Boheiri, Boḩeyrī, and Boveyrī) is a village in, and the capital of, Markazi Rural District in the Central District of Dashti County, Bushehr province, Iran.

== Demographics ==
=== Population ===
At the time of the 2006 National Census, the village's population was 944 in 206 households. The following census in 2011 counted 920 people in 271 households. The 2016 census measured the population of the village as 1,070 people in 328 households.
