= Darby Dunn =

American journalist and reporter

Darby Dunn (née Mullany) is an American journalist and reporter, known for appearing on CNBC, CNNfn, CNN, WNBC Channel 4 New York, and News12 Connecticut.

As of February 5, 2007 she has returned to CNBC where she is a general reporter and frequent anchor of the hourly CNBC.com News Now updates. She also serves as a substitute anchor on the network's business day programming.
