= Arabi, Bushehr =

Village in Bushehr province, Iran

Arabi Persian: عربي
- Village
- Location within Iran
- Coordinates: 28°42′35″N 51°19′40″E
- Country: Iran
- Province: Bushehr
- County: Dashti
- District: Central
- Rural District: Markazi

Population (2016)
  - Total: 1,135
- Time zone: UTC+3:30 (IRST)

Arabi (Persian: عربي) (Note: Also romanized as ‘Arabī) is a village in Markazi Rural District of the Central District in Dashti County, Bushehr province, Iran.

== Demographics ==
=== Population ===
At the time of the 2006 National Census, the village's population was 1,096 in 253 households. The following census in 2011 counted 1,178 people in 302 households. The 2016 census measured the population of the village as 1,135 people in 334 households.
