= Metal (disambiguation) =

A metal is a material that is typically hard, opaque, shiny, and has good electrical and thermal conductivity.

Metal may also refer to:

== People with the name ==
- Tamara Metal (1933–2022), Israeli Olympic high jumper and long jumper, and captain of the Israel women's national basketball team

== Places ==
- Metal Township, Pennsylvania, US

== Art and entertainment ==
=== Music ===
- Metal music or heavy metal music

=== Albums ===
- Metal (Annihilator album)
- Metal (Pierre Estève album)
- Metal (Manilla Road album) or its title track
- Metal (Preston Reed album) or its title track
- Metal (EP), by Newsted
- Metals (album), by Feist

=== Songs ===
- "Metal" (song), a song by Gary Numan from The Pleasure Principle
- "Metal", a song by Jimmy Edgar and Sophie from Cheetah Bend
- "Metal", a song by the Beths from Straight Line Was a Lie
- "The Metal", a song by Tenacious D from The Pick of Destiny

=== Other uses in art and entertainment ===
- Metal (magazine), an Argentine former heavy metal magazine
- Metal.de, German-language online magazine
- Métal, a 1928 portfolio by Germaine Krull
- Metal: A Headbanger's Journey, a documentary
- Metal Sonic, a character in Sonic the Hedgehog

== Other uses ==
- Metal (API), a graphics API from Apple for iOS and macOS
- Metal (wuxing), a phase of the Chinese philosophy of Wu Xing
- Metals, an academic journal on metallurgy and related topics.
- Metals, types of tincture in heraldry
- Road metal, the crushed stone used for road surfaces and railway track ballast

== See also ==
- Metallicity: in astronomy, a "metal" is any element other than hydrogen or helium
- Medal (disambiguation)
- Meddle (disambiguation)
- Mettle (disambiguation)
- Metel (disambiguation)
- Metallic (disambiguation)
- Metal Industries (disambiguation)
- Metal on Metal (disambiguation)
- Metal pair (disambiguation)
- Metal rock (disambiguation)
- Precious metal (disambiguation)
- Bare metal (disambiguation)
