= JoJo's Pitter Patter Pop! =

2018 puzzle video game

- App icon featuring the character Jotaro Kujo
- Developer: Bandai Namco Entertainment
- Publisher: Bandai Namco Entertainment
- Series: JoJo's Bizarre Adventure
- Platforms: Android, iOS
- Release: JP: October 10, 2018
- Genre: Puzzle (tile-matching)
- Mode: Single-player

JoJo's Pitter Patter Pop! (Note: Japanese: JoJo no Pita Pata Poppu (ジョジョのピタパタポップ)) (commonly referred to as simply Pitter Patter or abbreviated as PPP) was a tile-matching video game developed and published by Bandai Namco Entertainment for iOS and Android, and was released on October 10, 2018, in Japan. The game was supported throughout its lifetime with regular content updates until the game's server was shut down on September 2, 2021.

The game was based on the JoJo's Bizarre Adventure anime series with many of its characters being super deformed or 'chibified' and the game itself having a pop-up book aesthetic. The main game consisted of the player creating teams of two 'units' to fight against an assortment of characters with the goal of draining the opponent's HP bar before a timer ran out. The game had two main currencies: coins which had many uses (uncapping unit's levels, purchasing power-ups, pulling in the coin gasha etc.) and diamonds, the game's premium currency, whose main purpose was for pulling on gachas with a higher chance of better ranking units or limited time units. The game used a free-to-play model with diamonds being purchasable from the in-game shop.

== Gameplay ==
Pitter Patter Pop was a single-player 2D tile-matching video game based on the anime adaptation of the JoJo's Bizarre Adventure manga series, encompassing the first five parts of the series' story: Phantom Blood, Battle Tendency, Stardust Crusaders, Diamond Is Unbreakable, and Golden Wind as well as the OVA adaptation of the spin-off manga Thus Spoke Kishibe Rohan.

=== Battles ===
A standard fight between the player (Giorno Giovanna and Guido Mista, left) and an enemy (Ghiaccio, right)

Players formed teams of two characters and battled opponents in timed match-three puzzle stages, matching four or more character tiles on a 6×6 grid to deal damage, charge character skills, and activate special mechanics such as Stand Up Time, which allowed players to create larger tile formations for exponentially greater damage. Battles consumed one of five regenerating hearts, and successful stage completion rewarded coins, experience points, and other items, with fast clears triggering Rush Time for bonus coins before progressing through successive stages to a boss battle that offered greater rewards.

=== Special Battles ===
==== Score Attack ====
Score Attack was a special type of battle in which the opponent had no health bar, instead being replaced by a score counter. As the player dealt damage to the opponent their score would fill up. Units in this mode had a limited amount of times they could use their skill. This would continue until the timer ran out after which the players final score would be added to a global leaderboard. Each month a new Score Attack would appear with the top placers on the previous leaderboard being greatly rewarded with coins, diamonds and chests. Score Attack did not require hearts to partake.

==== Bingo Cards ====
Bingo Cards were another special type of battle where the opponent had a score counter. In battle the player would have to perform special tasks (Using a certain colour of unit, using a unit from a specific part, creating squares of a specific size in Stand Up, etc.) to stamp their bingo card. If a line was made then the player would be rewarded with coins, diamonds etc.

==== All Out War ====
In All Out War the player would have to defeat the same enemy without using the same unit twice 51 times. As they progressed through the 51 battles the player would be rewarded with coins, diamonds and even gacha tickets.

==== Tower Battle ====
Tower Battles were a series of especially difficult battles which required Tower Keys to partake in. These Tower Keys could be unlocked by playing regular battles. As the player went through each tower they would earn challenge points, which could be used to unlock special stickers.

=== Gacha ===
There were multiple kinds of Gacha that change depending on its contents. The types are mostly dictated by the kind of units present on the banner, if it distributes rewards on tenfolds and how it functions.

- Premium Gacha - All featured units are not limited with no additional rewards on a tenfold.
- Super Rate Up Premium Gacha - A Premium Gacha with very high rates for the featured unit.
- Ora Ora Gacha - At least one of the featured units is limited, includes additional rewards on a tenfold.
- W Ora Ora Gacha - At least one of the featured units is a 'WGR' unit. Sometimes includes tenfold stamp rewards.
- Super Ora Ora Gacha - At least one of the featured units is limited, includes additional rewards on a tenfold.
- Step Up Gacha - A Gacha with five steps and no limited featured units, which has different diamond cost each step. The steps also have additional bonuses, like a guaranteed GR on step three. On the fifth step the player is guaranteed to receive one of the featured units on the last draw of the tenfold.
- Mini Step Up Gacha - A Gacha with three steps, which functions the same as a normal Step Up Gacha with fewer steps.
- Special Step Up Gacha - A Step Up Gacha with at least one limited featured unit. It was functionally identical to a Step Up Gacha.

Through gameplay or from daily rewards the player could earn 'Gacha Tickets' which could be used to freely pull on any Gacha.

=== JoJo Mansion ===
A 3-storey JoJo Mansion

The second main aspect of gameplay was the 'JoJo Mansion', a building with eight rooms capable of holding up to two units each. As the player leveled up more storeys would become available up to a maximum of three storeys for a total of 24 rooms. By using furniture tickets unlocked from battles players could purchase furniture to decorate each room. Players could assign a unit to each room (two if the first unit was Skill Level 5). While in the room units could be interacted with in a number of different ways. Players could give their units gifts which would increase a friendship meter. Gifts came in three different levels each giving more 'friendship points' than the last. Each unit also had a preferred gift which would greatly increase their friendship meter. On occasion, units could 'visit' another room, this would earn the player a small number of experience points.

In the 2.7.0 patch Villas were added which allowed the player to add up to six units to a single "Premium Room" which could be decorated with "Premium Furniture".

In the 3.1.0 patch a new feature was added to the Mansion. On the roof of the JoJo Mansion players could throw a 'party' where the player could choose certain units to have an increased exp gain as well as a higher chance to appear as the random four units at the beginning of each battle.

=== Units ===
==== Unit Types ====
Upon release there were three different rarities of unit: Bronze Rarity (BR), Silver Rarity (SR) and Gold Rarity (GR) with BR being the most common and weakest up to GR being the strongest and rarest. In the 3.0.0 patch a new rarity was added, Double Gold Rarity (WGR), which was a combination of two characters in one unit. Beyond these rankings there also existed 'voiced' units who would say voicelines during gameplay, these voicelines being taken directly from the anime. All 'voiced' units were either GR or WGR rarity. Every BR and SR rarity unit was available in any Gacha but GRs and WGRs could be 'limited' meaning they could only appear in certain Gachas (generally being the featured unit). Characters could have more than one unit, generally a voiced and non-voiced version or to show appearances throughout different parts. For example Jotaro Kujo, the main protagonist of Stardust Crusaders, had seven different units based on him. Each unit was assigned a specific colour tile, generally corresponding to the colour mainly featured in their colour pallet. Two of the same character could not be on the same team.

==== Skills ====
Each unit had a unique skill which would generally be inspired by the character's abilities from the manga. Skills had five different levels of upgrading, each level increasing either the power, usefulness or duration of the skill. Skills could be upgraded either by pulling the same unit twice or from 'Skill Tickets' which could be earned through rewards from gameplay or by pulling a unit who was already Skill Level 5. There were three main types of skill; "Replace", (Note: Japanese: Henka (変化)) "Enhance" (Note: Japanese: Kyōka (強化)) and "Erase" (Note: Japanese: Shōkyo (消去)) as well as a fourth special type called "?". "Replace" skills replace tiles in a given shape or in a set pattern with the skill users tile or box, enhance skills would enhance tiles into 'Enhanced' or 'Intensified' tiles or boxes and erase skills would erase tiles in a set pattern. "?" skills were generally reserved for more unique skills such as stopping time.

==== Levels ====
When a new unit was unlocked it would begin at level 1 and could be leveled up either through experience points or from "Level Tickets". For every five levels the player would have to spend an increasing number of coins to 'uncap' the units level. The maximum level for units was 50 until the 3.0.0 patch when a new feature called "Awakening" was released. Through Awakening a player could use unit specific "Jewels" (unlocked by pulling the same unit more than once) to uncap a unit's level three times to a maximum level of 80. Doing so would also unlock a unit specific "EX Sticker".

==== Stickers ====
Stickers were a form of power-up added in the 2.7.2 patch. Stickers came in two forms, decoration stickers and battle stickers. These could be earned either by purchasing them with sticker ink or from event battles. In the 3.0.0 patch another form of stickers called "EX Stickers" were added which were unlocked when the player had fully awakened a unit. When a player had created a team of units they could create a "Pitter Set" which acted like a Sticker album. In it players could place stickers they had earned to either decorate their stickerbook or to power-up their units. Stickers each had their own abilities such as increasing the power of all units of a specific colour, increasing damage in Stand Up Time, etc. Some stickers had passive effects while others (especially EX Stickers) had specific activation conditions.

=== Chests ===
Chests were another type of gacha which could contain any number of rewards such as currency or tickets. Chests came in five different types, Iron, Bronze, Silver, Gold and Platinum, each one of increasing rarity and better prizes. Chests could be earned in a number of different ways such as completing certain conditions in battles, performing well in Score Attack or daily rewards.

=== Adventures ===
Adventures were added to the game in the 2.5.3 patch. Players could choose a group of five units to go on "adventures" which could last from two to ten hours depending on the rewards. The most common rewards from Adventures were gifts, coins, and Level Tickets, with diamonds being a rare reward also. Certain event Adventures could also reward the player with chests.

== Marketing ==
JoJo's Pitter Patter Pop was revealed in the September 2018 issue of Ultra Jump on August 17, 2018, as part of the JoJo SD Project. (Note: Japanese: JoJo SD Purojekuto (ジョジョSDプロジェクト)) To promote the game a teaser app entitled JoJo's Pitter Patter Pop! Chiramise (Note: Japanese: JoJo no Pita Pata Poppu Chiramise (ジョジョのピタパタポップ ちらみせ)) was released on August 27, 2018, which allowed players to take pictures with the various chibified characters in the full game. This feature was later added to the full game in an update. The full game's release was set to coincide with the release of the Golden Wind anime adaptation with many of the games updates adding content which coincided with the content of the most recently released episode. Both a Twitter account and an Instagram account were set up to advertise upcoming events in the game. Collectable keychains, badges and coasters featuring artwork of different units in the game were available for purchase upon release. To promote the game, Japanese shōnen manga magazine V Jump would regularly publish articles about new units and features that would be coming to the game in future updates.

From March 8 to 15, 2019, the game held a collaboration with the games JoJo's Bizarre Adventure: Diamond Records and JoJo's Bizarre Adventure: Stardust Shooters. In this collaboration players could receive exclusive furniture, diamonds and gacha tickets for playing. From July 19 to August 18, 2019, the game had a collaboration with Tower Records to celebrate their return as an online retailer. Due to the game having been shut down on September 2, 2021, Bandai Namco has removed all references to the game from its official website, as well as having it removed from both the Google Play Store and the Apple App Store.

== Reception ==
The game was well received upon release with many players commenting on the cute visuals and easy to learn gameplay. Despite only being officially released in Japanese the game gained a niche but devoted following in the West with many guides and translation communities forming, most notably an English subreddit and Discord server. The game reached 1 million active players on August 28, 2020.
