= List of JoJo's Bizarre Adventure video games =

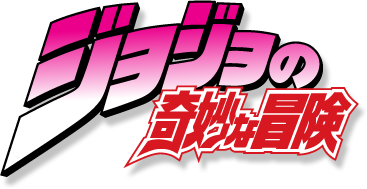
Official Japanese logo used by Capcom and All Star Battle

Seventeen video games based on Hirohiko Araki's manga and anime series JoJo's Bizarre Adventure, which began serialization in the weekly shōnen manga anthology Weekly Shōnen Jump in 1987, have been released. The first game, which was released on March 5, 1993, and uses the series' title, is a role-playing video game released for the Super Famicom. It is based on the third story arc in the series, Stardust Crusaders. On December 18, 1998, Capcom released a fighting game in arcades, also adapted from Stardust Crusaders, entitled JoJo's Bizarre Adventure. In 1999, an updated version titled JoJo's Bizarre Adventure: Heritage for the Future was ported to the PlayStation on October 14 and the Dreamcast on November 25, and in 2012, a high-definition version was released for PlayStation Network and Xbox Live Arcade on August 21 and August 22, respectively.

Another Capcom game, titled GioGio's Bizarre Adventure, based on JoJo's fifth story arc, Golden Wind, was released for the PlayStation 2 on July 25, 2002, and used 3D environments. On October 26, 2006, JoJo's Bizarre Adventure: Phantom Blood, which was based on the eponymous first arc of the series, was released for the PlayStation 2. The game was developed by Anchor Inc. and published by Bandai. At a July 5, 2012, press conference celebrating the series's 25th anniversary, Araki announced JoJo's Bizarre Adventure: All Star Battle for the PlayStation 3, developed by CyberConnect2 and published by Bandai Namco Games. Released on August 29, 2013, All Star Battle is a fighting game in which the cast is categorized by "Battle Styles", which determine what moves the player can execute via the "style" button. The same developer and publisher later released JoJo's Bizarre Adventure: Eyes of Heaven in Japan on December 17, 2015. In 2017, a mobile game was released in Japan to commemorate JoJo's 30th anniversary. The game featured free manga panels available in black-and-white and in color, and included a virtual pet game starring Iggy, a Boston Terrier who serves as one of the main characters of Stardust Crusaders. In the summer of 2019, a battle royale arcade game titled JoJo's Bizarre Adventure: Last Survivor was scheduled to be released, but it was not released in arcades until December 18, 2019.

Numerous JoJo characters have appeared in Shōnen Jump crossover games. Before the first JoJo game was released, Bandai released an action role-playing game titled Famicom Jump: Hero Retsuden on February 15, 1989. Its sequel, Famicom Jump II: Saikyō no Shichinin, released on December 2, 1991, features Jotaro Kujo as a playable character. Both games were available on the Famicom. Characters from JoJo's Bizarre Adventure were also featured in the 2005 Nintendo DS Weekly Shōnen Jump crossover game Jump Super Stars and its sequel Jump Ultimate Stars, including Jotaro and Dio as playable characters. Jonathan and Joseph Joestar were playable characters in J-Stars Victory VS, which released on March 19, 2014, for the PlayStation 3 and PlayStation Vita. In 2019, the Stardust Crusaders versions of Jotaro and Dio were announced to be added to the roster of playable characters in Jump Force.

== List of games ==
=== Licensed games ===
Licensed games
Game	Details
JoJo's Bizarre Adventure Original release date(s): JP: March 5, 1993	Release years by system: 1993—Super Famicom
JoJo's Bizarre Adventure Original release date(s): JP: March 5, 1993	Notes: A role-playing video game
JoJo's Bizarre Adventure Original release date(s): JP: December 18, 1998	Release years by system: 1998—Arcade
JoJo's Bizarre Adventure Original release date(s): JP: December 18, 1998	Notes: A fighting video game; Published by Capcom; Known in Japanese as ジョジョの奇妙な冒険, JoJo no Kimyō na Bōken
JoJo's Bizarre Adventure: Heritage for the Future Original release date(s): JP: September 13, 1999; (Arcade): JP: October 14, 1999; (PlayStation): JP: November 25, 1999; (Dreamcast)	Release years by system: 1999—Arcade, Dreamcast, PlayStation
JoJo's Bizarre Adventure: Heritage for the Future Original release date(s): JP: September 13, 1999; (Arcade): JP: October 14, 1999; (PlayStation): JP: November 25, 1999; (Dreamcast)	Notes: An action video game; Published by Capcom; Port of the 1998 JoJo's Bizarre Adventure video game; Known in Japanese as ジョジョの奇妙な冒険 未来への遺産, JoJo no Kimyō na Bōken: Mirai he no Isan
GioGio's Bizarre Adventure Original release date(s): JP: July 25, 2002	Release years by system: 2002—PlayStation 2
GioGio's Bizarre Adventure Original release date(s): JP: July 25, 2002	Notes: An action-adventure video game; Published by Capcom; Known in Japanese as ジョジョの奇妙な冒険 黄金の旋風, JoJo no Kimyō na Bōken: Ōgon no Kaze, 'JoJo's Bizarre Adventure: Golden Wind'
JoJo's Bizarre Adventure: Phantom Blood Original release date(s): JP: October 26, 2006	Release years by system: 2006—PlayStation 2
JoJo's Bizarre Adventure: Phantom Blood Original release date(s): JP: October 26, 2006	Notes: An action-adventure video game; Developed by Anchor Inc. and published by Bandai; Known in Japanese as ジョジョの奇妙な冒険 ファントムブラッド, JoJo no Kimyō na Bōken Fantomu Buraddo
JoJo's Bizarre Adventure HD Ver. Original release date(s): JP: August 21, 2012	Release years by system: 2012—PlayStation Network, Xbox Live Arcade
JoJo's Bizarre Adventure HD Ver. Original release date(s): JP: August 21, 2012	Notes: A fighting video game; Developed by Capcom; High-definition port of the 1998 JoJo's Bizarre Adventure video game
JoJo's Bizarre Adventure: All Star Battle Original release date(s): JP: August 29, 2013	Release years by system: 2013—PlayStation 3
JoJo's Bizarre Adventure: All Star Battle Original release date(s): JP: August 29, 2013	Notes: A fighting video game; Developed by CyberConnect2 and published by Bandai Namco Entertainment; Known in Japanese as ジョジョの奇妙な冒険 オールスターバトル, JoJo no Kimyō na Bōken Ōru Sutā Batoru
JoJo's Bizarre Adventure: Stardust Shooters Original release date(s): JP: March 10, 2014	Release years by system: 2014—Android, iOS
JoJo's Bizarre Adventure: Stardust Shooters Original release date(s): JP: March 10, 2014	Notes: An action video game; Released 4 days later for iOS; Developed by Drecom, produced by CyberConnect2, and published by Bandai Namco Entertainment; Known in Japanese as ジョジョの奇妙な冒険 スターダストシューターズ, JoJo no Kimyō na Bōken: Sutādasuto Shūtāzu
JoJo's Bizarre Adventure: Eyes of Heaven Original release date(s): JP: December 17, 2015; NA: June 28, 2016; EU: July 1, 2016	Release years by system: 2015—PlayStation 3, PlayStation 4
JoJo's Bizarre Adventure: Eyes of Heaven Original release date(s): JP: December 17, 2015; NA: June 28, 2016; EU: July 1, 2016	Notes: A fighting video game; Developed by CyberConnect2 and published by Bandai Namco Entertainment; Known in Japanese as ジョジョの奇妙な冒険 アイズオブヘブン, JoJo no Kimyō na Bōken Aizu Obu Hebun
JoJo's Bizarre Adventure: Diamond Records Original release date(s): JP: February 20, 2017	Release years by system: 2017—Android, iOS
JoJo's Bizarre Adventure: Diamond Records Original release date(s): JP: February 20, 2017	Notes: An action video game; Developed and published by Bandai Namco Entertainment; Known in Japanese as ジョジョの奇妙な冒険 ダイヤモンドレコーズ, JoJo no Kimyō na Bōken: Daiyamondo Rekōzu
JoJo's Bizarre Adventure: The Official App Original release date(s): JP: June 2017	Release years by system: 2017—Android, iOS
JoJo's Bizarre Adventure: The Official App Original release date(s): JP: June 2017	Notes: Includes a virtual pet video game featuring Iggy; Known in Japanese as ジョジョの奇妙な冒険 公式アプリ, JoJo no Kimyō na Bōken: Kōshiki Apuri
JoJo's Pitter Patter Pop! Original release date(s): JP: October 10, 2018	Release years by system: 2018—Android, iOS
JoJo's Pitter Patter Pop! Original release date(s): JP: October 10, 2018	Notes: A puzzle video game; Published by Bandai Namco Entertainment; Known in Japanese as ジョジョのピタパタポップ, JoJo no Pita Pata Poppu
JoJo's Bizarre Adventure: Last Survivor Original release date(s): JP: December 18, 2019	Release years by system: 2019—Arcade
JoJo's Bizarre Adventure: Last Survivor Original release date(s): JP: December 18, 2019	Notes: A battle royale video game; Developed by Historia and published by Bandai Namco Entertainment; Known in Japanese as ジョジョの奇妙な冒険 ラストサバイバー, JoJo no Kimyō na Bōken: Rasuto Sabaibā
JoJo's Bizarre Adventure: All Star Battle R Original release date(s): JP: September 1, 2022; WW: September 2, 2022	Release years by system: 2022—Nintendo Switch, PlayStation 4, PlayStation 5, Xbox One, Xbox Series X/S
JoJo's Bizarre Adventure: All Star Battle R Original release date(s): JP: September 1, 2022; WW: September 2, 2022	Notes: A fighting video game; Developed by CyberConnect2 and published by Bandai Namco Entertainment; Updated remaster of JoJo's Bizarre Adventure: All Star Battle
JoJo's Bizarre Adventure: Ora Ora Overdrive Original release date(s): JP: September 25, 2025	Release years by system: 2025—Apple App Store, Google Play
JoJo's Bizarre Adventure: Ora Ora Overdrive Original release date(s): JP: September 25, 2025	Notes: A simulation role-playing video game; Developed by gumi; Known in Japanese as ジョジョの奇妙な冒険 オラオラオーバードライブ, JoJo no Kimyō na Bōken: Ora Ora Ōbādoraibu
JoJo's Bizarre Adventure: Golden Spirit Original release date(s): WW: August 13, 2026	Release years by system: 2026—Android, iOS
JoJo's Bizarre Adventure: Golden Spirit Original release date(s): WW: August 13, 2026	Notes: Developed by Wanda Cinemas Games and KLab

=== Appearances ===
Appearances
Game	Details
Famicom Jump II: Saikyō no Shichinin Original release date(s): JP: December 2, 1991	Release years by system: 1991—Famicom
Famicom Jump II: Saikyō no Shichinin Original release date(s): JP: December 2, 1991	Notes: A role-playing video game; Published by Bandai; Features Jotaro Kujo as one of the seven playable characters; Known in Japanese as Famicom Jump II: The Ultimate Seven (ファミコンジャンプII 最強の7人, Famikon Janpu Tsū Saikyō no Shichinin)
Jump Super Stars Original release date(s): JP: August 8, 2005	Release years by system: 2005—Nintendo DS
Jump Super Stars Original release date(s): JP: August 8, 2005	Notes: An action video game; Developed by Ganbarion and published by Nintendo; Features the Stardust Crusaders versions of Jotaro and Dio Brando as playable characters; Known in Japanese as ジャンプスーパースターズ, Janpu Sūpā Sutāzu
Jump Ultimate Stars Original release date(s): JP: November 23, 2006	Release years by system: 2006—Nintendo DS
Jump Ultimate Stars Original release date(s): JP: November 23, 2006	Notes: A fighting video game; Developed by Ganbarion and published by Nintendo; The sequel to Jump Super Stars; Known in Japanese as ジャンプアルティメットスターズ, Janpu Arutimatto Sutāzu; Features the Stardust Crusaders versions of Jotaro and Dio as playable characters
J-Stars Victory VS Original release date(s): JP: March 19, 2014	Release years by system: 2014—PlayStation 3, PlayStation Vita
J-Stars Victory VS Original release date(s): JP: March 19, 2014	Notes: A fighting video game; Published by Bandai Namco Games; Known in Japanese as ジェイスターズ ビクトリーバーサス, Jei Sutāzu Bikutorī Bāsasu; Jonathan and Joseph Joestar appear as playable characters.
Jump Force Original release date(s): JP: February 14, 2019; WW: February 15, 2019	Release years by system: 2019—PlayStation 4, Windows, Xbox One, Nintendo Switch
Jump Force Original release date(s): JP: February 14, 2019; WW: February 15, 2019	Notes: A fighting video game; Developed by Spike Chunsoft and published by Bandai Namco Entertainment; The Stardust Crusaders versions of Jotaro and Dio were announced to be added to the roster of playable characters.; Giorno Giovanna, the son of Dio and the protagonist of Golden Wind, was later added to the game as DLC.
