= Metallica (disambiguation) =

Metallica is an American heavy metal band.

Metallica may also refer to:

- Metallica (album) or The Black Album, a 1991 album by Metallica

as well as:

- Metallica (beetle), a beetle genus
- Metallica Resources, a Canadian mineral exploration and development company
- De re metallica, a 1556 catalog of the mining and refining of metals, by Georgius Agricola
- Metallica, the stand of Risotto Nero, an antagonist in the manga series Jojo’s Bizarre Adventure story arc Golden Wind

== See also ==
- Metalica, a prototype Pentax camera
- Metallic (disambiguation)
- Metallicus (disambiguation)
