= Rare Metals =

Rare metal or Rare Metals may refer to:

- Avalon Rare Metals, the former name of Avalon Advanced Materials, a Canadian mineral extraction company
- GPS, V1: Rare Metals, an album by trumpeter Dave Douglas
- Precious metal, any metal of very high value
- Rare-earth element, a set of 17 nearly indistinguishable lustrous silvery-white soft heavy metals
- Rare Metals, Arizona, an unincorporated community in the United States

== See also ==
- Precious metal (disambiguation)
