= Meddle (disambiguation) =

Meddle is a 1971 album by Pink Floyd.

Meddle may also refer to:

- "Meddle" (song), a song by Little Boots
- "Meddle", a song by Boston Spaceships from Zero to 99

== See also ==
- Medal (disambiguation)
- Metal (disambiguation)
- Mettle (disambiguation)
