= Last survivor =

Last Survivor or Last Survivors may refer to:

- The Last Survivors, a 2014 post-apocalyptic film directed by Thomas Hammock.
- Last Survivors, a 2021 American thriller film directed by Drew Mylrea.
- The Last Survivors, the series of science fiction novel by Susan Beth Pfeffer.
- Last Survivor (video game), a 1988 third-person shooter arcade game by Sega. It was later ported to the FM Towns by CSK Research Institute.
- JoJo's Bizarre Adventure: Last Survivor, a 2019 Battle royale third-person shooter arcade game by Bandai Namco Amusement
- Alien: Isolation - Last Survivor, the Downloadable content of 2014 video game Alien: Isolation.
