= N. metallicus =

N. metallicus may refer to:

- Niveoscincus metallicus, the metallic cool-skink or metallic skink, a lizard species endemic to Australia
- Notropis metallicus, a ray-finned fish species

== See also ==
- Metallicus (disambiguation)
