= Metallic =

Metallic may be a reference to:

- Metal
- Metalloid, metal-like substance
- Metallic bonding, type of chemical bonding
- Metallicity, in astronomy the proportion of elements other than helium and hydrogen in an object
- Metallic color, a color that gives the appearance of metal
- Metallic dragon, a classification of dragon found in the role playing game Dungeons & Dragons
- Metallic paint, paint that provides the appearance of metal
- Heavy metal music, a genre of rock music

== See also ==
- Metallica (disambiguation)
- Metal (disambiguation)
