= JoJo's Bizarre Adventure: All Star Battle =

2013 video game

- European cover art, featuring Jotaro Kujo with his Stand Star Platinum, and Dio in the background.
- Developer: CyberConnect2
- Publisher: Bandai Namco Entertainment
- Directors: Hiroshi Matsuyama; Kenei Nakasha
- Producer: Noriaki Niino
- Designer: Kenei Nakasha
- Programmer: Marko karaica
- Artist: Yoshitaka Kinoshita
- Writer: Hirohiko Araki (original story)
- Composer: Chikayo Fukuda
- Platforms: PlayStation 3; All Star Battle R; Microsoft Windows; Nintendo Switch; PlayStation 4; PlayStation 5; Xbox One; Xbox Series X/S
- Release: JP: August 29, 2013; EU/AU: April 25, 2014; NA: April 29, 2014; All Star Battle R: JP: September 1, 2022; NA/EU: September 2, 2022
- Genre: Fighting
- Modes: Single-player, multiplayer

JoJo's Bizarre Adventure: All Star Battle (Note: Japanese: ジョジョの奇妙な冒険 オールスターバトル, Hepburn: JoJo no Kimyō na Bōken Ōru Sutā Batoru) is a fighting game developed by CyberConnect2 and published by Bandai Namco Entertainment for PlayStation 3. Based on Hirohiko Araki's long-running manga series JoJo' s Bizarre Adventure, the game allows players to compete against each other using 40 characters taken from the first eight story arcs, as well as one guest character from another manga also created by Araki. The game was released in Japan on August 29, 2013, and was released internationally in late April 2014.

A remaster featuring additional content, titled JoJo's Bizarre Adventure: All Star Battle R (Note: Japanese: ジョジョの奇妙な冒険 オールスターバトルR, Hepburn: JoJo no Kimyō na Bōken Ōru Sutā Batoru Āru) was released for Nintendo Switch, PlayStation 4, PlayStation 5, Xbox One, Xbox Series X/S, and Microsoft Windows via Steam on September 2, 2022.

== Gameplay ==
Jonathan Joestar (right) blocking an attack from Dio Brando (Phantom Blood version, left). The in game display includes a health bar, Guard Gauge, and Heart Heat Gauge.

JoJo's Bizarre Adventure: All Star Battle is a 3D fighting game in which players can fight against each other using characters taken from the first eight story arcs of Hirohiko Araki's JoJo's Bizarre Adventure manga series (and one from a prior work by Araki), fighting in various locations taken from the manga. Like most fighting games, the aim is to defeat your opponent by draining their stamina gauge (HP is used in a certain game mode) with various attacks and special techniques. The player wins a round by draining all of their opponent's stamina, or by possessing more stamina than their opponent when time runs out. Gameplay uses five main buttons; light, medium, and heavy attacks, a dodge button, and a "Style" button. Along with the ability to use various special attacks and techniques with different directional inputs, each character possesses a Battle Style, allowing them to utilize additional moves with the "Style" button. Styles have five main categories, consisting of Hamon, Vampirism, Mode, Stand and Mounted, in addition to character exclusive Styles such as Baoh Armed Phenomenon and Ogre Street, each utilizing different abilities when the Style button is pressed. For example, Hamon users can use the power of Sendo to augment the strength of their attacks, whilst Stand users can summon out their Stand, giving them additional move types whilst also making themselves more vulnerable.

Attacking and receiving damage fills up a player's Heart Heat Gauge (ハートヒートゲージ, Hāto Hīto Gēji) which, when filled to either one or two levels, allows players to perform powerful Heart Heat Attacks (ハートヒートアタック, Hāto Hīto Attakku; HHA) or Great Heat Attacks (グレートヒートアタック, Gurēto Hīto Attaku; GHA), depending on how much their gauge is filled and which multiple button input is chosen. Players can decrease their opponent's Heart Heat Gauge by using taunts when they are knocked down. Players can also use Flash Cancels (Note: Strange Cancel (プッツンキャンセル, Puttsun Kyanseru)) to deplete their own Heart Heat Gauge to cancel their current combo attack and chain into a new one. The Heart Heat Gauge is also used in some Battle Styles and certain special techniques. Rush Mode (ラッシュモード, Rasshu Mōdo), similar to the "Blazing Fists Match" system of Capcom's 1998 fighting game based on the series, occurs when two "Rush" attacks collide with each other, beginning a button mashing minigame. When a character's Stamina is low, the character enters one of two modes to turn the tide of the match: Rumble Mode (ゴゴゴモード, Gogogo Mōdo), which increases the character's attack strength and Heart Heat Gauge restoration, and Resolve Mode (覚悟モード, Kakugo Mōdo), which in addition to the bonuses from Rumble Mode adds a temporary invincible armor as well. Novice players can use the Easy Beat (イージービート, Ījī Bīto) system, which allows them to more easily string together combos and techniques by using only a single button. Along with the stamina gauge, players also have a Guard Gauge (ガードゲージ, Gādo Gēji) which depletes when they block attacks, causing them to become vulnerable if it is completely drained in a Guard Crush (ガードクラッシュ, Gādo Kurasshu). The Guard Gauge is also depleted by Stylish Evades, (Note: Stylish Moves (スタイリッシュムーブ, Sutairisshu Mūbu)) special dodges that when executed properly make the character perform one of their iconic poses from the manga. The remaster adds three new mechanics; Assist Attacks, in which players can summon another character for an attack, Air Dash, which lets fighters dash in the air, and Stylish Guard, which lets players dodge attacks at the last second.

Each of the game's stages, based on locations from the manga, feature battleground gimmicks (Note: Stage Gimmicks (ステージギミック, Sutēji Gimikku)) which trigger when a character is knocked down onto a certain area, causing hazards such as a speeding chariot to run characters down or a rain of poison dart frogs to induce a poison status. There are also Dramatic Finishes, (Note: Situation Finishes (シチュエーションフィニッシュ, Shichuēshon Finisshu)) which trigger when a player is defeated by a super move in a certain area, replicating scenes from the manga.

=== Game modes ===
All Star Battle features many different game modes. Story Mode is a single player option that allows players to go through an original story inspired by the first eight parts of the manga, with the eighth part featuring the protagonists of all eight parts in a series of original "what-if" battles. Players control the protagonists of the series, partly reenacting various scenes from the manga. After completing a Part's Story Mode once, a new option known as Another Battle opens up, allowing the player to play as the opposite character in the Story Mode matches, taking on the role of the series' antagonists. It is only through Story Mode that additional on-disc characters are unlocked through play.

Campaign Mode is an online mode where players can unlock items known as Customize Medals which allow them to change the preset appearance and mannerisms of their unlocked characters. Campaign Mode also features several random events that can assist the player in either Vision or Boss matches, such as Rudol von Stroheim depleting the opponent's health bar, Cioccolata increasing the rate at which Boss HP is depleted when more Energy is used, or Ken Oyanagi offering the player a game of rock-paper-scissors to confirm that the next match will be a Boss match of the player's choice. The player can receive Energy as a result of a random event, or it can be purchased via microtransactions.

Versus Mode features both local offline play and online play in either free battles or ranked matches which affect a player's Battle Score. The Western version of the game adds an Arcade Mode, in which the player faces up against eight computer-controlled opponents.

In the remaster, the Story and Campaign Modes are replaced by All Star Battle Mode, which consists of over 100 individual battles, each with their own conditions and special missions for rewards. These include reenactments of battles from the original story and original "what-if" battles. Each page also features an unlockable boss battle reenacting a major battle in the original story. In addition, Versus Mode now features 3-on-3 team battles and a tournament function.

=== Battle Styles ===
Characters each possess one of five main Battle Styles (バトルスタイル, Batoru Sutairu), reflecting the origins of their own abilities from the manga's continuity, although some characters may possess aspects of the other Battle Styles.

- Hamon (波紋, Hamon): Hamon users can use Hamon breathing to recharge their Heart Heat Gauge or utilize the Hamon in stronger versions of their special attacks. Such attacks will impart unrecoverable damage to a Vampire or Pillar Man's stamina.
- Vampirism (吸血, Kyūketsu): Vampires can use their powers with draining attacks to restore their stamina and Heart Heat Gauge. When a vampire takes damage, a percentage of the damage is displayed in silver. This portion of the damage will heal over time, unless subsequent damage is taken, resetting the restorable health. Special attacks from Hamon users bypass this system, dealing only unrecoverable damage.
- Mode (流法(モード), Mōdo): The Pillar Men can activate their respective Modes, which increase their power but drain their Heart Heat Gauge; they are left vulnerable when their Heart Heat Gauge runs out. They each also possess a more powerful form of their Mode which increases their power further, at the cost of increasing the time they are vulnerable after running out of Heart Heat Gauge. Like Vampires, Pillar Men also receive healable silver damage unless they are struck by Hamon attacks.
- Stand (スタンド, Sutando): Stand users can bring out their respective Stand at will, offering different movesets and special attacks. They also possess a unique Stand Rush (スタンドラッシュ, Sutando Rasshu) ability that allows them to unsync with the Stand mid combo to begin a new combo. Some characters possess Stands that are always active and have different play styles than other Stand using characters. For example, Jotaro Kujo's Star Platinum is toggled on or off by the player while Hol Horse's Emperor is always active.
- Mounted (騎乗, Kijō): Characters Mounted on horseback have the ability to call their horse at will, offering up different movesets on or off their horses. These characters also possess Stands, but they are only seen during certain moves.
- Baoh Armed Phenomenon (バオー武装現象(アームド・フェノメノン), Baō Āmudo Fenomenon): As he is in a symbiotic relationship with a parasite known as Baoh, Ikuro Hashizawa possesses a unique Battle Style that makes his body transform to suit his needs. Every 25% of his health gauge he loses activates a new benefit: gradual stamina recovery, increased attack strength, and a combination of the Rumbling and Resolve Modes of other characters. If his opponent is using a move that increases their strength temporarily (such as Ermes's Kiss Stickers or Giorno's Gold Experience Requiem), Baoh gains the ability to dodge more easily.
- Ogre Street (食屍鬼街(オウガーストリート), Ougā Sutorīto): A style unique to All Star Battle R, used exclusively by new character Speedwagon. His playstyle allows him to summon his two allies from Ogre Street, Tattoo and an unnamed Kempo Master, who can perform ranged attacks that can be chained into combos.
- Bro and Mammoni (兄貴とママっ子野郎(マンモーニ), Aniki to Manmōni): A style unique to All Star Battle R, used exclusively by new character Prosciutto. His playstyle allows him to switch between executing combo attacks with his partner, Pesci, and attacking with his Stand Grateful Dead directly.
- Best Science in the World (世界一の科学力, Sekai Ichi no Kagakuryoku): A style unique to All Star Battle R, used exclusively by new character Stroheim. His playstyle allows him to use his cybernetic enhancements in various ways, such as attacking with a machine gun in his torso or launching his prosthetic hand. Most notably, Stroheim can equip and unequip the UV lasers attached to his shoulders at any time, allowing him to deal rapid damage until the lasers run out of energy.

Both Vampires and the Pillar Men are limited to nighttime or indoor stages until certain qualifications are met in Story Mode. They also all possess a unique animation for the Dramatic Finish on Part 3's Dio's Mansion stage.

Several characters possess unique additional status bars or icons. These include Guido Mista's available ammunition and members of Sex Pistols, Enrico Pucci's 14 Words to switch between Whitesnake and C-Moon, or Gyro's Steel Balls and Rotation energy. Characters from Part 7 Steel Ball Run have a shared unique status bar which represents how many parts of the Saint's Corpse (聖人の遺体, Seijin no Itai) they possess; for example, one piece allows Gyro to use the Scan move, two pieces allow Johnny to automatically restore his fingernail bullets (otherwise requiring a special move to activate), while all three pieces enable Valentine to use D4C -Love Train- which makes him immune to projectile attacks, particularly those from Johnny and Gyro.

== Characters ==
There are a total of 32 playable characters available on the game disc, with 14 available from the start. Nine additional characters were made available as DLC, eventually bringing the total number of characters to 41. One of these downloadable characters, Ikuro Hashizawa, makes a guest appearance from Hirohiko Araki's earlier manga series, Baoh.

Ten additional characters were added for the remastered release, bringing the total to 51 initial characters. Most of these newcomers in All Star Battle R originate from CyberConnect2's subsequent JoJo game, Eyes of Heaven. Seven additional characters were added to the remaster as post-launch downloadable content via two season passes, with two others added as free DLC.

Part 1 Phantom Blood

- Jonathan Joestar (voice: Kazuyuki Okitsu), Hamon
- Will A. Zeppeli (voice: Yoku Shioya), Hamon
- Robert E. O. Speedwagon (voice: Yoji Ueda (Note: This character was still voiced despite not being playable in the original PlayStation 3 version.)), Ogre Street (Note: Introduced in All Star Battle R)
- Dio Brando (voice: Takehito Koyasu), Vampirism (Note: Dio Brando and Dio are the same character within the work of fiction but are separate playable characters due to the different abilities possessed by the character. Dio Brando from Phantom Blood has Vampirism as his Battle Style. Dio from Stardust Crusaders (stylized in uppercase English as "DIO") is a Stand user, although some of his moves have Vampirism traits.)

Part 2 Battle Tendency

- Joseph Joestar (voice: Tomokazu Sugita), Hamon (Note: The two Joseph Joestars are the same character within the work of fiction but are separate playable characters due to the different abilities possessed by the character. Joseph from Battle Tendency is a Hamon user. Joseph from Stardust Crusaders (referred to as "Old Joseph" in the game) is a Stand user, although some of his moves have Hamon traits.)
- Caesar Anthonio Zeppeli (voice: Takuya Satō), Hamon
- Lisa Lisa (Note: LisaLisa (All Star Battle) / Lisa Lisa (Elizabeth) (All Star Battle R)) (voice: Atsuko Tanaka), Hamon (Note: Downloadable character on PS3)
- Rudol von Stroheim (voice: Atsushi Imaruoka), Best Science in the World (Note: Downloadable character in All Star Battle R)
- Esidisi (voice: Keiji Fujiwara), Heat Mode
- Wamuu (voice: Akio Ōtsuka), Wind Mode
- Kars (voice: Kazuhiko Inoue), Light Mode (Note: Kars's GHA transforms him into "Kars (Ultimate Life Form)", switching his Mode Battle Style for an entirely new moveset.)

Part 3 Stardust Crusaders

- Jotaro Kujo (voice: Daisuke Ono), Stand: Star Platinum (Note: The two Jotaro Kujos in All Star Battle R are the same character within the work of fiction but are separate playable characters due to the different abilities possessed by the character.)
- Old Joseph Joestar (voice: Tomokazu Sugita / Unshō Ishizuka (Note: All Star Battle R voice actor)), Stand: Hermit Purple
- Mohammed Avdol (voice: Masashi Ebara / Kenta Miyake), Stand: Magician's Red
- Noriaki Kakyoin (voice: Kōji Yusa / Daisuke Hirakawa), Stand: Hierophant Green
- Jean Pierre Polnareff (Note: Jean Pierre Eiffel in All Star Battle) (voice: Hiroaki Hirata / Fuminori Komatsu), Stand: Silver Chariot
- Iggy (voice: Shigeru Chiba / Misato Fukuen), (Note: Iggy is a dog who mostly communicates in canine vocalizations like barking and growling, provided by Shigeru Chiba (Misato Fukuen in the remaster). He also has some voice lines representing his thoughts in unique character introductions and victory screens, also provided by Chiba/Fukuen. Some of Iggy's thoughts and actions are also being described by the game's narrator, voiced by Tōru Ōkawa.) Stand: The Fool
- Hol Horse (voice: Hōchū Ōtsuka / Hidenobu Kiuchi), Stand: Emperor (Note: The Emperor) / Hanged Man (Note: The Hanged Man) (Note: Several of Hol Horse's attacks utilize the Stand Hanged Man (voice: Fumihiko Tachiki / Takuya Kirimoto) possessed by J. Geil. (Note: Centerfold))
- Mariah (voice: Ayahi Takagaki), Stand: Bastet (Note: Bast)
- Pet Shop, Stand: Horus
- Vanilla Ice (Note: Cool Ice) (voice: Hiroyuki Yoshino / Shō Hayami), Stand: Cream (Note: Vanilla Ice, like Dio, is a Stand user with some Vampirism move traits.)
- Dio (voice: Takehito Koyasu), Stand: The World

Part 4 Diamond Is Unbreakable

- Josuke Higashikata (Note: Josuke Higashikata 4) (voice: Wataru Hatano / Yūki Ono), Stand: Crazy Diamond (Note: Shining Diamond) (Note: The two Josuke Higashikatas are separate characters within the work of fiction, with their names written differently in Japanese but the same when written in English. The English version of the game uses their Parts' respective numbers to label them.)
- Okuyasu Nijimura (voice: Wataru Takagi), Stand: The Hand
- Koichi Hirose (voice: Romi Park / Yūki Kaji), Stand: Echoes (Note: Reverb)
- Rohan Kishibe (voice: Hiroshi Kamiya / Takahiro Sakurai), Stand: Heaven's Door
- Jotaro Kujo (Part 4) (voice: Daisuke Ono), Stand: Star Platinum
- Shigekiyo "Shigechi" Yangu (voice: Kappei Yamaguchi), Stand: Harvest
- Yukako Yamagishi (voice: Mamiko Noto), Stand: Love Deluxe
- Keicho Nijimura (voice: Tomoyuki Shimura), Stand: Bad Company (Note: Worse Company)
- Yuya Fungami (voice: Kishō Taniyama), Stand: Highway Star (Note: Highway Go Go)
- Akira Otoishi (voice: Showtaro Morikubo), Stand: Red Hot Chili Pepper (Note: Chili Pepper)
- Yoshikage Kira (voice: Rikiya Koyama / Toshiyuki Morikawa), Stand: Killer Queen (Note: Deadly Queen) (Note: Yoshikage Kira and Kosaku Kawajiri are the same character within the work of fiction, but are separate playable characters due to the different abilities possessed by the character during Diamond Is Unbreakable. Yoshikage Kira is from the middle of the manga, and as such his Killer Queen uses Sheer Heart Attack (voice: Tsutomu Kashiwakura / Toshiyuki Morikawa). Kosaku Kawajiri is in his awakened state from the climax of the manga (though his normal appearance can be won as an alternate costume in Campaigns 4 and 5), and as such his Killer Queen incorporates the independent Stand Stray Cat (Note: Feral Cat in All Star Battle) and uses Bites the Dust, (Note: Bite the Dust in All Star Battle) a move that also features the character Hayato Kawajiri (voice: Yūko Satō / Rina Satō).) (Note: The original Yoshikage Kira is downloadable content available via a code included in first edition pressings of the game or bundled with the downloadable version from the PlayStation Store. On December 3, 2013, Kira was made available for purchase for those who bought standard editions of the game.)
- Kosaku Kawajiri (voice: Rikiya Koyama / Toshiyuki Morikawa), Stand: Killer Queen / Stray Cat

Part 5 Vento Aureo / Golden Wind

- Giorno Giovanna (voice: Daisuke Namikawa / Kenshō Ono), Stand: Gold Experience / Gold Experience Requiem (Note: Golden Wind (Requiem)) (voice: Misa Watanabe / Kenshō Ono)
- Bruno Bucciarati (voice: Noriaki Sugiyama / Yūichi Nakamura), Stand: Sticky Fingers (Note: Zipper Man)
- Narancia Ghirga (voice: Yuuko Sanpei / Daiki Yamashita), Stand: Aerosmith (Note: Li'l Bomber)
- Guido Mista (voice: Kenji Akabane / Kōsuke Toriumi), Stand: Sex Pistols (Note: Six Bullets) (voice: Asami Imai / Kōsuke Toriumi)
- Pannacotta Fugo (voice: Hisafumi Oda / Junya Enoki), Stand: Purple Haze (Note: Purple Smoke) (voice: Hisao Egawa / Junya Enoki) / Purple Haze Distortion (Note: Purple Smoke Distortion) (voice: Hisao Egawa / Junya Enoki) (Note: In an announcement on the official website on September 5, 2013, Namco Bandai and CyberConnect 2 revealed they would be making Pannacotta Fugo a free download.)
- Leone Abbacchio (voice: Taiten Kusonoki / Junichi Suwabe), Stand: Moody Blues (Note: Moody Jazz)
- Trish Una (voice: Sayaka Senbongi), Stand: Spice Girl (Note: Spicy Lady)
- Prosciutto and Pesci (voice: Takuma Terashima and Shinya Fukumatsu / Tatsuhisa Suzuki and Subaru Kimura), Stand: The Grateful Dead (Note: Thankful Dead (All Star Battle) / The Thankful Death (All Star Battle R)) and Beach Boy (Note: Fisher Man) (Note: Prosciutto acts as the primary fighter while Pesci acts as his summoned character, similar to Speedwagon's Ogre Street Battle Style.)
- Ghiaccio (voice: Tatsuhisa Suzuki / Nobuhiko Okamoto), Stand: White Album (Note: White Ice)
- Risotto Nero (voice: Shinshū Fuji), Stand: Metallica (Note: Metallic)
- Diavolo (voice: Toshiyuki Morikawa / Katsuyuki Konishi), (Note: Diavolo appears in pre-match introductions and the default post-match victory screens as his alter-ego Vinegar Doppio (voice: Akira Ishida / Soma Saito).) Stand: King Crimson (Note: Emperor Crimson)

Part 6 Stone Ocean

- Jolyne Cujoh (voice: Miyuki Sawashiro / Fairouz Ai), Stand: Stone Free (Note: Stone Ocean)
- Ermes Costello (voice: Chizu Yonemoto / Mutsumi Tamura), Stand: Kiss (Note: Smack)
- Foo Fighters (voice: Ryoko Shiraishi / Mariya Ise), Stand: Foo Fighters
- Narciso Anasui (Note: Narc Anastasia (All Star Battle) / Narciso Anastasia (All Star Battle R)) (voice: Yūichi Nakamura / Daisuke Namikawa), Stand: Diver Down (Note: Diver Drive)
- Weather Report (Note: Weather Forecast) (voice: Tōru Ōkawa / Yūichirō Umehara), Stand: Weather Report / Heavy Weather (Note: Heavy Forecast)
- Enrico Pucci (Note: Father Pucchi) (voice: Tomokazu Seki), Stand: Whitesnake (Note: Pale Snake) (voice: Tomokazu Seki) (Note: The two Enrico Puccis in All Star Battle R are the same character within the work of fiction, but are separate playable characters due to the different abilities possessed by the character during Stone Ocean. Enrico Pucci is reworked in R to remove C-Moon and Made in Heaven. Enrico Pucci (Final) is the original version of the character from All Star Battle, which incorporates all three of his Stands into his moveset.)
- Enrico Pucci (Final) (Note: To avoid revealing plot information from the Stone Ocean anime adaptation's final episodes, C-Moon and Made in Heaven were excluded in the initial release of All Star Battle R, but were added to a separate character, Enrico Pucci (Final), on December 1, 2022 to coincide with the finale.) (Note: Father Pucchi (Final)) (voice: Sho Hayami / Tomokazu Seki), Stand: Whitesnake (voice: Takuya Kirimoto / Tomokazu Seki) / C-Moon (Note: Full Moon (All Star Battle) / See Moon (All Star Battle R)) (voice: Takuya Kirimoto / Tomokazu Seki) / Made in Heaven (Note: Maiden Heaven)

Part 7 Steel Ball Run

- Johnny Joestar (voice: Yūki Kaji), Mounted: Slow Dancer and Stand: Tusk
- Gyro Zeppeli (voice: Shin-ichiro Miki), Mounted: Valkyrie and Stand: Scan / Ball Breaker
- Diego Brando (voice: Takehito Koyasu), Mounted: Silver Bullet and Stand: Scary Monsters (Note: Frightening Monsters) (Note: The two Diego Brandos in All Star Battle R are separate characters within the work of fiction, signified by the abilities they possess during the events of Steel Ball Run. Diego Brando is the main universe variant in the manga, using the Stand Scary Monsters. Alternate World Diego is an alternate universe version of Diego from the climax of the story, utilizing a variant of Dio's Stand, The World (stylized in uppercase English as "THE WORLD").)
- Alternate World Diego (voice: Takehito Koyasu), Mounted: Silver Bullet and Stand: The World
- Funny Valentine (voice: Yasuyuki Kase), Stand: Dirty Deeds Done Dirt Cheap (D4C) (Note: Dirty Deeds Done Dirt Cheap is only referred to as "D4C", with various synonyms of the phrase used in its place otherwise.)

Part 8 JoJolion

- Josuke Higashikata (Note: Josuke Higashikata 8) (voice: Mitsuaki Madono), Stand: Soft & Wet
- Toru (voice: Nobunaga Shimazaki), Stand: Wonder of U (voice: Takayuki Sugo) (Note: Unlike other Stands, Wonder of U acts as the primary fighter, while Toru himself only appears in cutscenes.)

Baoh

- Ikuro Hashizawa (voice: Kōki Uchiyama (Note: In his Baoh state, Ikuro Hashizawa does not speak outside of grunts and shrieks of "Barubarubaru." As such, his actions are instead narrated by the game's narrator, Tōru Ōkawa. However, Kōki Uchiyama's voice is heard in a unique character introduction and some victory quotes.)), Baoh Armed Phenomenon

Notes

International edition name changes

Many non-playable characters appear throughout the game. Dialogue for all characters in the game are quotes from the original manga or related works, such as light novels. The voice cast of the first season of the anime series reprise their roles for the game; the remastered release expands this to the voice cast of the first five seasons.

== Stages ==
The various stages in All Star Battle are all modeled after a particular scene in the manga.

Part 1 Phantom Blood

- Dio's Castle (ディオの館, Dio no Yakata): From JoJo's Bizarre Adventure Volume 5 The Final Hamon!

Part 2 Battle Tendency

- Battlefield (闘技場, Tōgijō): From JoJo's Bizarre Adventure Volume 11 The Warrior Returns to the Wind

Part 3 Stardust Crusaders

- Dio's Mansion (DIOの館, Dio no Yakata): From JoJo's Bizarre Adventure Volume 26 The Miasma of the Void, Vanilla Ice
- El Cairo City (カイロ市街, Kairo Shigai): From JoJo's Bizarre Adventure Volume 27 Dio's World and Volume 28 The Faraway Journey, Farewell Friends
- Cairo Bridge (カイロ陸橋, Kairo Kōka): From JoJo's Bizarre Adventure Volume 28 The Faraway Journey, Farewell Friends^{R}

Part 4 Diamond Is Unbreakable

- Cape Boingy-Boing (ボヨヨン岬, Boyoyon Misaki): From JoJo's Bizarre Adventure Volume 32 Yukako Yamagishi Falls in Love^{R}
- Kira Estate (吉良邸, Kira-tei): From JoJo's Bizarre Adventure Volume 39 Father's Tears
- Morioh Town (杜王町, Moriō-chō): From JoJo's Bizarre Adventure Volume 45 Another One Bites the Dust, Volume 46 Crazy Diamond Is Unbreakable, and Volume 47 Goodbye Morioh Town–The Golden Heart

Parte 5 Vento Aureo / Golden Wind

- Naples Train Station (ネアポリス駅, Neaporisu Eki): From JoJo's Bizarre Adventure Volume 52 Express Train to Florence and Volume 53 The Grateful Dead
- Rome (ローマ市街, Rōma Shigai): From JoJo's Bizarre Adventure Volume 60 Meet the Man in the Colosseum!
- Colosseum (コロッセオ, Korosseo): From JoJo's Bizarre Adventure Volume 61 His Name Is Diavolo^{R}

Part 6 Stone Ocean

- Green Dolphin Street State Prison (G. D. st(グリーン・ドルフィン・ストリート)刑務所, Gurīn Dorufin Sutorīto Keimusho): From Stone Ocean Volume 6 Torrential Downpour Warning
- Everglades (湿地帯, Shitchi-tai): From Stone Ocean Volume 4 Go, Foo Fighters!^{R}
- Kennedy Space Center (ケネディ宇宙センター, Kenedi Uchū Sentā): From Stone Ocean Volume 16 At Cape Canaveral and Volume 17 Made in Heaven^{KSC}

Part 7 Steel Ball Run

- Rocky Mountains Village (ロッキー山脈 麓野村, Rokkī Sanmyaku Fumoto no Mura): From Steel Ball Run Volume 6 Scary Monsters^{R}
- Philadelphia Seaside (フィラデルフィアの海岸沿い, Firaderufia no Kaigan-zoi): From Steel Ball Run Volume 20 Love Train - The World Is One

Part 8 JoJolion

- Wall Eyes (壁の目, Kabe no Me): From JoJolion Volume 1 Welcome to Morioh Town

^R Remaster exclusive.
^KSC To avoid revealing plot information from the Stone Ocean anime adaptation's final episodes, this stage was excluded in the initial release of All Star Battle R, but was added back on December 1, 2022, to coincide with the finale.

== All Star Battle League ==
As a way to promote the video game, Namco Bandai and CyberConnect2 performed a series of Livestream broadcasts called JoJo's Bizarre Adventure: All Star Battle League (ジョジョの奇妙な冒険 オールスターバトルリーグ, JoJo no Kimyō na Bōken Ōru Sutā Batoru Rīgu) during July and August 2013. During the broadcasts, Bandai Namco producer Noriaki Niino, CyberConnect2 producer Hiroshi Matsuyama, and comedian and JoJo fan Kendo Kobayashi hosted a tournament between the computer controlled characters to display gameplay. There were six sets of preliminary matches where characters were grouped together randomly, with the top two characters out of each group moving onto the quarter-finals. A seventh group consisting of the last characters to be announced and a fan favorite from the previous groups was run, with the winner joining the other twelve characters. Several fan favorite characters were included as seats. The sixteen characters then were put into a tournament bracket, with the winner of the All Star Battle League ultimately being Dio. To commemorate the victory, a special PlayStation 3 theme featuring Dio and his Stand The World was made available.

== Development and release ==
All Star Battle was first announced in July 2012. The game is built with an engine known as the JoJo Shading Requiem (JOJO(ジョジョ)・シェーディング・レクイエム, JoJo Shēdingu Rekuiemu), which gives it a stylized manga look. The game's voice cast features the same voice cast from the anime for the first two parts while the remaining six parts feature a new voice cast.

The game is sold as both a standard edition and a limited edition "Gold Experience Box" (黄金体験BOX(ゴールド・E(エクスペリエンス)・ボックス), Gōrudo Ekusuperiensu Bokkusu), which contains a gold plate etching of Giorno Giovanna and his Stand Gold Experience, a figure statue of Jotaro Kujo and his Stand Star Platinum, and the game's original soundtrack on a CD resembling the power of the Stand Whitesnake. First edition pressings of both the standard and limited editions include a memo pad designed to look like Part 4 supporting character Hayato Kawajiri under the thrall of Rohan Kishibe's Heaven's Door Stand and a download code to access the character Yoshikage Kira.

On September 19, 2013, Namco Bandai Games announced it would be releasing the game internationally in 2014, with a release date of Spring 2014 announced for Europe. The game will have localized names for some of the characters, with the publisher working with Shueisha to ensure names fit with Hirohiko Araki's intentions "while not offending any party", and will match with the North American and European releases of the recent anime series for consistency. In late January 2014, it was announced that All Star Battle would be given a limited physical release in the United States through Amazon.com and ClubNamco.com, as well a release on the PlayStation Network. The game will also include a new Arcade Mode not found in the Japanese release featuring the player fighting eight CPU-controlled characters that will occasionally enter a "Harvest" mode to connect online and get more gold (the in-game currency). The release also includes all of the patches released for the Japanese version. The European release of the games will also feature a limited edition release, dubbed the "Exquisite Edition", which in addition to a physical copy of the game includes a figurine of Jotaro Kujo and Star Platinum studded with 6000 Swarovski crystals, which will receive a limited release and be auctioned off for charity through GamesAid. The auction ended on April 5, 2014, at £687. Another Exquisite Edition was sold at auction during the 2014 Anime Expo, with proceeds going to a local children's hospital.

=== All Star Battle R ===
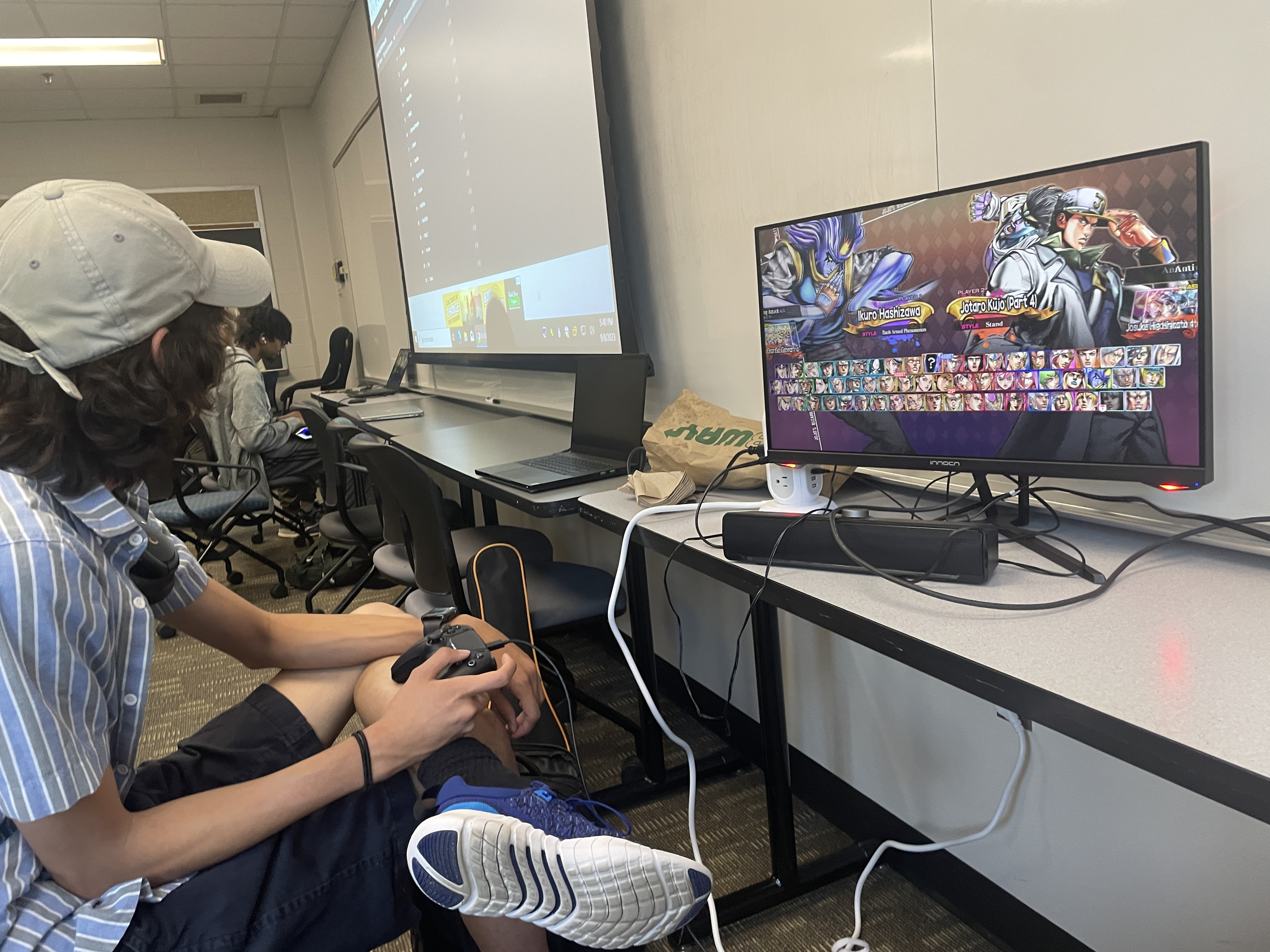
A man playing All Star Battle R at Virginia Commonwealth University in 2023 showing the character select screen with Baoh and Jotaro Kujo (Part 4) highlighted.

A standalone updated version of the game, titled JoJo's Bizarre Adventure: All Star Battle R, was announced on March 9, 2022, during a PlayStation "State of Play" livestream. It was created to celebrate the manga's 35th anniversary and the anime's 10th anniversary. The version update features revised single-player modes, new gameplay mechanics, and additional playable characters and stages. Every character from the first six parts (mainly most characters from Part 3, as well as every character from Parts 4, 5 and 6) have also received re-recorded voice overs by the voice cast from the anime, replacing some of the game's original voice cast, while characters from the remaining two parts have also received re-recorded voice overs from the game's original voice cast with the characters' designs also updated to more closely resemble the anime.

On May 26, 2022, Bandai Namco Entertainment released the Street Date Announcement trailer, which confirmed a September 2, 2022, release date for the game, as well as a season pass, a Digital Deluxe Edition and a Collector's Edition, which comes with the Digital Deluxe Edition bonus, the pre-order bonus, and a figure of Jolyne Cujoh in all regions, with an additional mug shot placard included in the European edition. In Europe and Japan, the season pass also comes bundled with the Collector's Edition, with the Japanese edition additionally including the game's official soundtrack in a digital-only format.

An early access demo of the game was available on the PlayStation 5 and PlayStation 4 on June 16, 2022. The demo featured a limited character roster and a single stage, with only online mode and practice mode being available. Access to the demo ended on June 22, 2022, with a feedback survey available to take afterward to July 6, 2022.

The updated version was released on September 2, 2022, for Nintendo Switch, PlayStation 4, PlayStation 5, Xbox One, Xbox Series X/S, and Microsoft Windows via Steam.

== Downloadable content ==
=== PlayStation 3 ===
Several downloadable content campaigns were released. The first online campaign, "The Darkness That Haunts Morioh Town" (杜王町に巣食う闇, Moriō-chō ni Sukuu Yami), was made available at launch, featuring the downloadable characters Yoshikage Kira and Shigekiyo Yangu. The second online campaign, "The Ferocious Beasts" (どう猛な野獣, Dōmō na Yajū), added the downloadable characters Iggy and Pannacotta Fugo. The third campaign, "The Hamon Masters" (波紋の達人, Hamon no Tatsujin), added downloadable characters Lisa Lisa and Joseph Joestar as seen in Stardust Crusaders. The fourth campaign, "The Executioners of Terror" (恐怖の処刑人, Kyōfu no Shokeinin), added characters Vanilla Ice and Narciso Anasui. The fifth and final campaign, "This! Is! Baoh!!" (これが！バオーだッ!!, Kore ga! Baō da!!), added Ikuro Hashizawa as a downloadable character. On December 3, 2013, Yoshikage Kira was made available for purchase.

On December 19, 2013, costumes for Jotaro Kujo and Jean Pierre Polnareff based on promotional artwork for the arcade game JoJo's Bizarre Adventure: Heritage for the Future were released as a free download.

=== Remastered ===
Seven paid downloadable characters were released for the remastered version of the game, separated by two Season Passes. The first Season Pass contains four downloadable characters: Risotto Nero from Golden Wind, Rudol von Stroheim from Battle Tendency, Keicho Nijimura from Diamond Is Unbreakable, and Alternate World Diego from Steel Ball Run, as well as an additional pair of costumes for Rohan Kishibe and Mohammed Avdol.

The second Season Pass features three downloadable characters: Leone Abbacchio from Golden Wind, Yuya Fungami from Diamond is Unbreakable, and Toru's Stand Wonder of U from JoJolion, as well as a costume for Giorno Giovanna.

Two free downloadable characters, Weather Report and Enrico Pucci (Final) (the version of Pucci from the original ASB) from Stone Ocean, and the original game's Kennedy Space Center stage were released on December 1, 2022, to coincide with the release of the final episodes of Stone Ocean's anime adaptation.

== Reception ==
Reception

Aggregate score
Aggregator	Score
Metacritic	PS3: 71/100; All Star Battle R PC: 70/100; PS5: 73/100; XSXS: 75/100; NS: 71/100

Review scores
Publication	Score
Computer Games Magazine	7/10
Destructoid	7.5/10
Eurogamer	7/10
Famitsu	40/40
GameRevolution	5/10
GameSpot	6/10
IGN	7.4/10; 7/10 (All Star Battle R)
Nintendo Life	7/10 (All Star Battle R)
Push Square	7/10; 7/10 (All Star Battle R)
The Guardian	4/5
USgamer	3.5/5

=== PlayStation 3 ===
Famitsu gave All Star Battle a perfect 40/40. The game was a winner in the "Future" division of the 2012 "Japan Game Awards". The game sold over 500,000 pre-orders, and Namco Bandai producer Noriaki Niino thanked the fans of the manga series for making the game such a success. In an import review, Kotaku praised the game for its imagination and faithfulness to the source material, but acknowledged glaring problems such as balance issues and Campaign Mode's structure that leans towards microtransaction-type social games. In response to such criticisms domestically, CyberConnect2 released an update to the system to address balance problems on September 11, 2013, with a second update to further address these issues for October 2013; the recharge rate for Energy in Campaign Mode was also sped up to five minutes from 20 minutes starting September 6, 2013, without any announced final date and several items that would have been paid for were made free. Two more character balancing updates were released up through November 2013, during which time the Campaign Mode was updated to make five minutes the new permanent recharge rate. As of March 31, 2014, the game has shipped 700,000 copies.

=== Remaster ===
According to review aggregate website Metacritic, the Xbox Series X version received "generally favorable reviews", while the other versions received "mixed to average reviews". The remaster received nominations for Fighting Game of the Year at the 26th Annual D.I.C.E. Awards, as well as Best Fighting Game during The Game Awards 2022, but lost both awards to MultiVersus.
