= Medal (disambiguation) =

A medal is an object typically given as an award.

Medal may also refer to:

- Macmillan English Dictionary for Advanced Learners (MEDAL)
- Medal (band), English alternative rock band
- Medal (film), a 2022 Gujarati-language film
- Medals, currency surrogates used to play medal games

== See also ==
- Medallion (architecture)
- Meddle (disambiguation)
- Metal
- Mettle (disambiguation)
