= Metel =

Metel may refer to:

- Hugh Metel, 12th-century writer
- Soviet guard ship Metel, a 1934–1954 Soviet ship
- Metel (story), from Russian: Мете́ль, romanized: Metél', an 1830 story by Aleksandr Pushkin better known as The Blizzard or The Snow Storm
  - Metel (film), a 1964 adaptation of the story directed by Vladimir Basov, also known as The Blizzard
- Datura metel, a plant
- Metel Anti-Ship Complex (SS-N-14 'Silex'), a Soviet rocket-thrown torpedo similar to ASROC in service since 1969

== See also ==
- Metal (disambiguation)
