= JoJo's Bizarre Adventure: Diamond Records =

2017 3D action video game

- App icon from before the Reversal update, featuring the characters Jotaro Kujo (left) and Josuke Higashikata (right)
- Developer: Bandai Namco Entertainment
- Publisher: Bandai Namco Entertainment
- Series: JoJo's Bizarre Adventure
- Platforms: Android, iOS
- Release: JP: February 20, 2017
- Genre: Action
- Mode: Single-player

JoJo's Bizarre Adventure: Diamond Records (Note: Japanese: JoJo no Kimyō na Bōken: Daiyamondo Rekōzu (ジョジョの奇妙な冒険 ダイヤモンドレコーズ)) is a 3D action video game developed and published by Bandai Namco Entertainment for iOS and Android, and was released on February 20, 2017, in Japan. It has since received several updates, including a major 2018 update that changed the subtitle to Diamond Records Reversal (Note: Japanese: Daiyamondo Rekōzu Ribāsaru (ダイヤモンドレコーズ Reversal(リバーサル))) and added content from Golden Wind, the fifth part of the series.

The game is based on the JoJo's Bizarre Adventure anime series, with the main portion of the game consisting of quests based on the series' story. The player assembles and controls teams of JoJo's Bizarre Adventure characters, and play through the quests with the goal of knocking out enemy characters. The game uses a free-to-play model, with new characters and items acquired through a gacha mechanic.

On September 9, 2019, Bandai Namco Entertainment announced that the game would be terminating its service on November 18, 2019.

== Gameplay ==
The player, here as Josuke (left), completes stages by knocking out enemies.

Diamond Records is a single-player 3D action game based on the anime adaptation of the JoJo's Bizarre Adventure manga series, encompassing the first five parts of the series' story: Phantom Blood, Battle Tendency, Stardust Crusaders, Diamond Is Unbreakable, and Golden Wind, of which the first four parts were available at the time of the game's release. The player sets up teams of characters from these parts, who have varying sets of moves they can perform; some movesets are based on Hamon techniques, and some on Stand abilities. The characters – referred to as "statues" – are also played differently depending on what their type is. The player can strengthen their statues with various status effects, and teach them new moves, by equipping Mind items onto them. Statues and Minds are acquired through a gacha mechanic in exchange for the in-game currency, diamond coins, and are ranked on a five-star scale.

The main portion of the game consists of quests – stages based on episodes from the series' story – with the goal of knocking out the enemy characters. In addition to the regular story quests, the game includes event quests that are only available for a certain amount of time; by playing these, the player can get access to items and points, which can be exchanged for rewards. During events, statues and items relating to the event are possible to get as gasha drops. There is also a community feature, in which the player can join "towns" to chat with other players.

== Development and release ==
Diamond Records is developed and published by Bandai Namco Entertainment. The game was announced in December 2016 through the Ultra Jump magazine, along with the opening of pre-registration; as an incentive, players who created an account during pre-registration were given extra in-game items. The game was released in Japan on February 20, 2017, for Android and iOS devices as a free-to-play game, with the option to purchase in-game items.

The game has since gotten new content through post-release updates, including the addition of new characters. In June 2017, the new character type Solitary was added along with the introduction of the character Yoshikage Kira. On September 22, 2018, a major update was released, renaming the game JoJo's Bizarre Adventure: Diamond Records Reversal, and adding characters and other content from Golden Wind, the fifth part of JoJo's Bizarre Adventure; this was done to coincide with the October premiere of the Golden Wind anime adaptation.

== Reception ==
By March 22, 2017, more than two million user accounts had been registered. 4Gamer.net liked the character and environment graphics, describing them as rich.
