= Metal Industries (disambiguation) =

Metal Industries, Limited was a conglomerate of mostly British engineering companies that operated from 1922 to 1970.

Metal Industries may also refer to:

- Metalworking, the process of working with metals to create individual parts, assemblies, or large-scale structures
- IMI plc, a British-based engineering company formerly known as Imperial Metal Industries
- Sumitomo Metal Industries, a Japanese steel manufacturer
