= GioGio's Bizarre Adventure =

2002 video game

- Cover art, featuring Giorno and Mista, and the Stands Sex Pistols and King Crimson
- Developer: Capcom
- Publisher: Capcom
- Artist: Hirohiko Araki
- Composer: Mitsuhiko Takano
- Series: JoJo's Bizarre Adventure
- Engine: Artistoon
- Platform: PlayStation 2
- Release: JP: July 25, 2002
- Genre: Action-adventure
- Mode: Single-player

GioGio's Bizarre Adventure, known in Japan as JoJo no Kimyō na Bōken: Ōgon no Kaze, (Note: Japanese: ジョジョの奇妙な冒険 黄金(おうごん)の旋風(かぜ); "JoJo's Bizarre Adventure: Golden Wind") is an action-adventure video game developed and published by Capcom for the PlayStation 2 on July 25, 2002 in Japan. It is based on Golden Wind, the fifth part of Hirohiko Araki's manga series JoJo's Bizarre Adventure. The player controls characters from the manga, and fight enemies in 3D environments using both physical attacks, and special combination moves performed by spirit-like "Stand" characters released from the player character's body.

To recreate the art style used in the manga, Capcom developed a graphics technique called Artistoon, with which the game renders cel-shaded graphics; additionally, Araki's art was featured in the game. Capcom planned to release the game in North America and Europe, but after delays, it ended up not getting released outside Japan. Critics praised the game's visuals and presentation, commenting on how it recreated the look of the manga well, while the gameplay was met by mixed opinions. The game received a full English language fan translation in 2018.

== Gameplay ==
A battle, in which Bucciarati (right) uses his Stand to attack Giorno (left).

GioGio's Bizarre Adventure is an action-adventure game in which the player duels against enemies in 3D environments, controlling several characters who each have their own sets of moves: Giorno Giovanna, Bruno Bucciarati, Guido Mista, Narancia Ghirga, Pannacotta Fugo, Leone Abbacchio, and Trish Una. The battle system includes physical attacks such as kicking and punching, and the ability to dodge attacks by rolling; physical attacks are performed through a single-button input, and can be chained into a combination attack by pressing repeatedly.

Additionally, the player can release a spirit-like "Stand" character from the player character's body, through which they can perform special combination moves, which are more powerful. The Stands require energy to be used, which is drained whenever the Stand itself gets hit by an enemy, but recharges over time. Battles differ depending on the layout of the arena they are fought in, as well as the Stand abilities of the opponent: for instance, Bucciarati can use his Stand, Sticky Fingers, to create zippers in the walls, and enter holes within to avoid attacks. When the player wins a battle, they receive points and are graded based on their performance, which unlocks items in the game's art gallery mode. The game uses 3D and 2D cutscenes, which come in the form of exposition between battles, and slow-motion, mid-battle cutscenes, such as one showing the player's Stand punching out the enemy's teeth. In addition to fighting, the player has secondary objectives they can fulfill in the different levels.

== Development and release ==
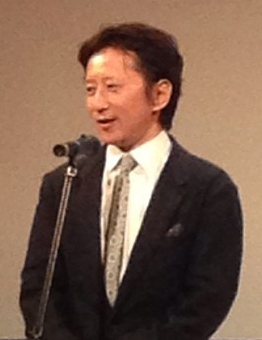
Series creator Hirohiko Araki provided artwork for the game.

GioGio's Bizarre Adventure was developed by Capcom. It is based on Golden Wind, the fifth part of Hirohiko Araki's manga series JoJo's Bizarre Adventure, and features artwork by Araki. To recreate the art style of the manga, Capcom developed a technique called Artistoon, which is used to render cel-shaded graphics. Capcom published the game in Japan on July 25, 2002 for the PlayStation 2, with a budget-priced re-release following on September 20, 2007.

Capcom also announced North American and European releases of the game, and showcased it at the 2002 edition of the annual Electronic Entertainment Expo (E3). The North American version was to be titled JoJo's Bizarre Adventure, while the European version was announced to be titled GioGio's Bizarre Adventure in August 2002. This change in naming was on the request of Araki, who wanted an Italian spelling in order to stay true to the title character. The game was shown at Sony Computer Entertainment Europe's PlayStation Experience expo in August 2002, and was available for the public to play. At E3 2002, it was announced for an October 2002 release in the West, but was delayed to December 2002, and then again to February 14, 2003. By May 2003, it had not been released outside Japan, and was not listed as part of Capcom's game lineup for E3 2003, leading Eurogamer to speculate that the Western release had been cancelled.

== Reception ==
Reception

Review score
Publication	Score
Famitsu	31/40

George Walter from the Official UK PlayStation 2 Magazine thought the gameplay felt "samey", but said that the creative use of various kinds of Stands prevented the game from feeling repetitive. David Smith at IGN thought the game seemed like a "rather basic action experience", with a set of offensive moves that felt limited, and said that while it at first is fun to use Stand abilities, the novelty of it eventually fades. He still considered it a "must-buy" for people who like the manga, but otherwise not something one would want to import a Japanese copy of immediately.

Critics enjoyed the game's visuals. Entertainment Weekly's Adam B. Vary thought the game did a good job at recreating the look and feel of the original manga. Walter called the game's visuals "gorgeous" and "striking", and thought that they were what would get people from places where the manga had not yet become popular interested in the game. Eurogamer's Tom Bramwell described the visuals as distinctive, and at times reminiscent of Jet Set Radio. Smith called GioGio's Bizarre Adventure among the most faithful manga-to-video game adaptations he had seen, praising the 3D recreation of the manga's artwork, and said that its use of effects such as speed lines and visual katakana sound effects made it feel familiar. He noted that the environments looked "a little crude" and with blurry textures if one looked at details up close, but that they looked impressive from a distance. Reviewers at Famitsu also enjoyed how the game reproduced the look of the manga in 3D, but noted that the presentation of the story felt insufficient for people who have not read the Golden Wind manga, and that it seemed mostly targeted towards people who already were fans of JoJo's Bizarre Adventure.
