= Metal on Metal (disambiguation) =

Metal on Metal is a 1982 album by Anvil, and the title song.

Metal on Metal may also refer to:

- "Metal on Metal" (song), a song by Kraftwerk from their 1977 album Trans-Europe Express
- Metal on Metal, a heavy metal radio show on WJCU Cleveland, Ohio hosted by Bill Peters since its debut in 1982
- A violation of the rule of tincture
