= Giorno Giovanna =

Fictional character from JoJo's Bizarre Adventure Part 5

- JoJo's Bizarre Adventure character
- Giorno Giovanna as illustrated by Hirohiko Araki
- First appearance: JoJo's Bizarre Adventure chapter 440 "Gold Experience, Part 1" (December 11, 1995)
- Last appearance: JoJo's Bizarre Adventure chapter 594 "The Sleeping Slave, Part 5" (April 5, 1999)
- Created by: Hirohiko Araki
- Voiced by: Japanese: Romi Park (GioGio's Bizarre Adventure); Daisuke Namikawa (All-Star Battle, Eyes of Heaven); Kensho Ono (2018–present); Natsumi Fujiwara (anime, child); English: Phillip Reich (2018–present); Janice Kawaye (anime, child)

In-universe information
- Full name: Giorno Giovanna
- Nickname: JoJo ("GioGio")
- Occupation: Passione Soldato (Formerly); Boss of Passione, Mafia CEO
- Family: Dio Brando (father); Jonathan Joestar (biological father); Unnamed mother Unnamed stepfather Donatello Versus (half-brother); Rikiel (half-brother); Ungalo (half-brother); George Joestar II (half-brother); Dario Brando (grandfather); Unnamed grandmother George Joestar I (grandfather); Mary Joestar (grandmother)
- Nationality: Italian
- Stand: Gold Experience; Gold Experience Requiem
- Date of birth: April 16, 1985

Giorno "JoJo" ("GioGio") Giovanna (Japanese: ジョルノ・ジョバァーナ, Hepburn: Joruno Jobāna) is a fictional character in the Japanese manga series JoJo's Bizarre Adventure, written and illustrated by Hirohiko Araki. The main protagonist of the series' fifth story arc, Golden Wind, he was born Haruno Shiobana (汐華 初流乃, Shiobana Haruno), the illegitimate son of Dio Brando while possessing Jonathan Joestar's body.

After being saved by an unknown mafia member in his childhood, Giorno dreams of joining the Italian mafia gang Passione to overthrow its boss, Diavolo, who keeps a very low profile, and close the drug trade, desiring to help the innocent. Joining Bruno Bucciarati and his team, they go on a mission to send Trish Una to her father, the boss of Passione. Giorno possesses a Stand known as Gold Experience (ゴールド・エクスペリエンス, Gōrudo Ekusuperiensu), (Note: "Golden Wind" in official English releases.) whose primary abilities are to give life to nonliving things, which is mostly used to turn inorganic objects into living organisms and creating body parts, acting as a healing ability.

Araki found it difficult to find the familial ties of the protagonist of Golden Wind, before deciding to have Giorno be the son of Dio who has Joestar blood. While Giorno is the main character of Golden Wind, Araki's difficulty in writing the team in Golden Wind eventually progresses to him making the entire team protagonists. He was voiced by Romi Park in GioGio's Bizarre Adventure, Daisuke Namikawa in JoJo's Bizarre Adventure: All Star Battle and JoJo's Bizarre Adventure: Eyes of Heaven. Kensho Ono and Phillip Reich voiced Giorno in the anime adaptation of Golden Wind in 2018 in Japanese and in English, respectively. Since then, Ono and Reich have been the official voice actor for the character. Critical reception of Giorno has been mixed, with some critics considering the premise of Giorno having the blood of Dio and a Joestar as intriguing and praising his personality, while others find him bland due to lacking independent moments that help him stand out on his own. The beating Giorno gave the villain Cioccolata drew the attention of critics and fans.

== Creation and development ==
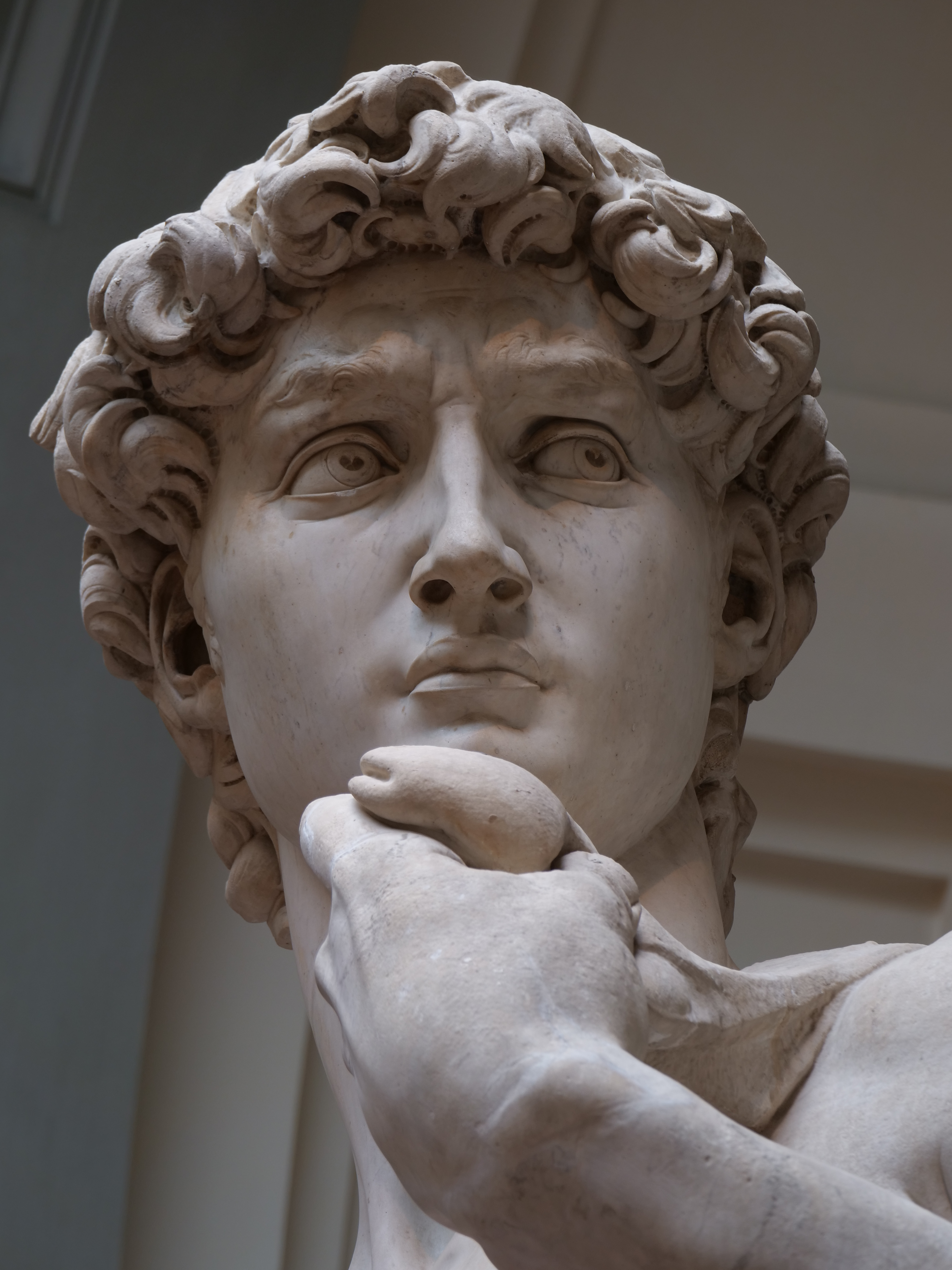
Michelangelo's David influenced Giorno's hairstyle.

Like other protagonists in the series, Giorno was designed to symbolize the part's story and setting and to stand out among the previous protagonists in terms of appearance, clothing, and silhouette. Araki finds it difficult on deciding who to choose as the next protagonist. Since the tactic of someone being Joseph Joestar's illegitimate son has already been used on Josuke Higashikata, he decided for Giorno to be the son of Dio who happens to have a blood of a Joestar. He also tried to portray the character differently as he doesn't want him to be too similar to Jotaro Kujo. There were also issues with what to do with the possibility of vampirism on the character, but it had been abandoned in the end. Araki's editor at the time, Hiroshi Sekiya, thought that Araki originally intended for Giorno to be a woman due to their discussion and how Giorno is created.

Araki thought that in addition to being a good person, the protagonist needs to be a hero as well – which he thought would require the character to solve problems alone through their own abilities; although the Bucciarati gang has a unified goal, they were depicted as standing on their own when fighting, and as a group of outcasts rather than a leader and his followers. Araki sees that writing for the team becomes a challenge and as the story progresses, they all become the protagonists rather than Giorno on his own. The curls in Giorno's hair were inspired by Michelangelo's statue David.

=== Casting ===
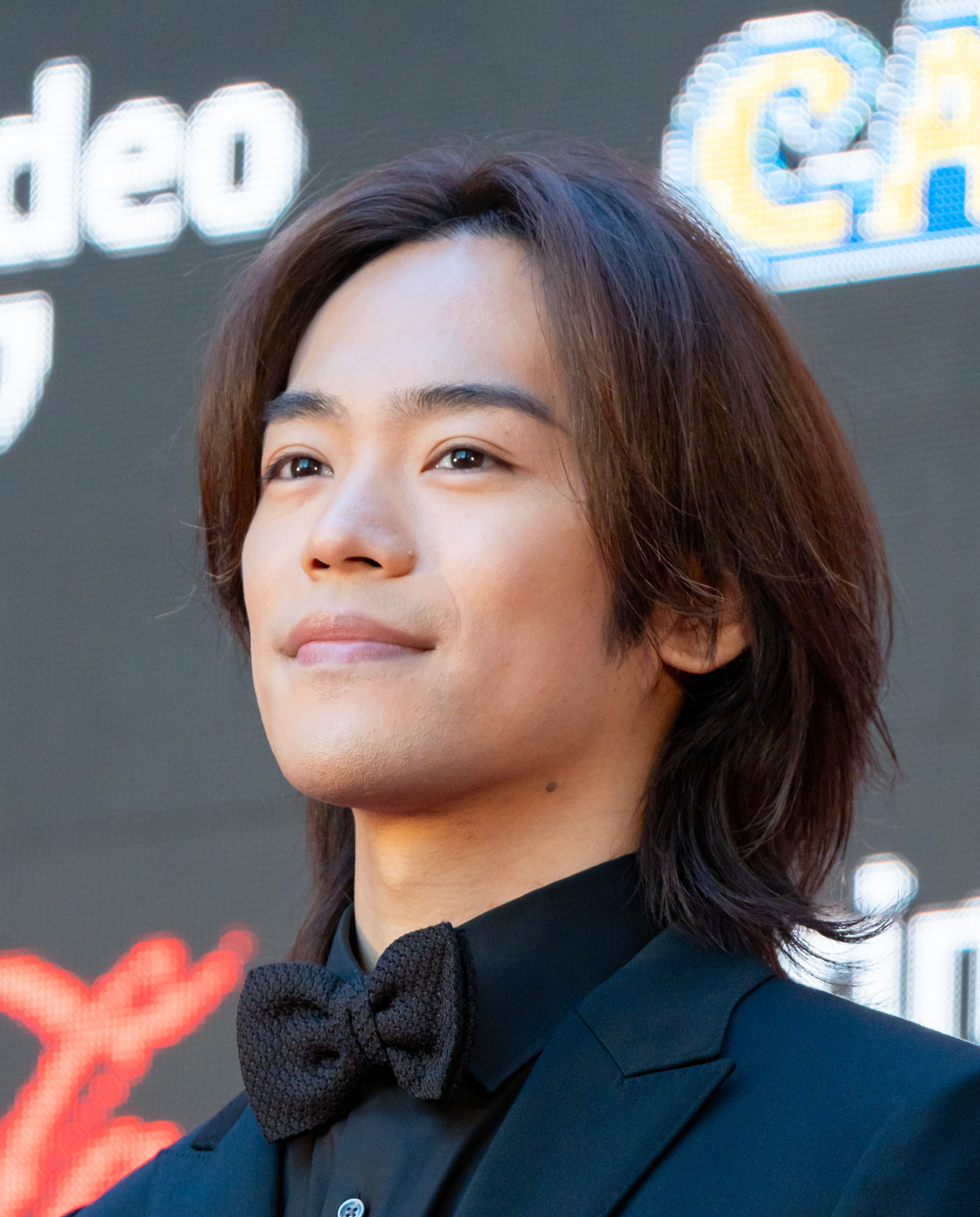
Kensho Ono provides Giorno Giovanna's voice in the TV anime.

In the GioGio's Bizarre Adventure video game, he was voiced by Romi Park. In the games JoJo's Bizarre Adventure: All-Star Battle and JoJo's Bizarre Adventure: Eyes of Heaven, he was voiced by Daisuke Namikawa. Starting from the anime adaptation of Golden Wind, he is voiced by Kensho Ono. Ono views Giorno as a calm and composed character with a strong will and determination and he wants to portray that aspect of the character. During the first recording, he felt grateful of being with Yūki Ono as it helped him on getting a grasp of the atmosphere of the series. For the English dub, Giorno is voiced by Phillip Reich. Reich both compares Giorno and Yuya Fungami, a character he voiced back in the anime adaptation of Diamond is Unbreakable, as two people with a sense of honor and responsibility, but he sees Giorno's as greater as he wants to eliminate the drug trade running rampant. He enjoys portraying the character's sense of justice and sees him as being more down-to-earth in comparison to other anime protagonists. Reich explains that he watched the anime's original dub as the practice of achieving the screams of "Muda". He notices that while watching the clips, Kensho Ono puts an emphasis on the "da" to make it faster, thus he ended up applying the technique. He practiced it daily to pick up the pace.

== Appearances ==
Giorno is at an airport, trying to swindle the belongings of unsuspecting tourists when he encounters Koichi Hirose, who is trying to find Haruno Shiobana by the orders of Jotaro Kujo after finding out he is the son of Dio, unaware that Haruno is now Giorno. After escaping from Koichi when he took his briefcase, he is confronted by Passione member Leaky-Eye Luca, who is killed by Giorno. He is then sought by Bruno Bucciarati who's investigating Leaky-Eye Luca's case. Giorno manages to win over Bucciarati by giving his reasons as to why he wants to join the mafia and both find commonality in their goals. He is advised to take a test by capo Polpo in order to become a member of Passione. After a reencounter with Koichi where the latter is convinced of the goodness living within Giorno, he passes the test. He indirectly kills Polpo through the use of a gun possessing as a banana, as Polpo has killed an innocent bystander during an earlier confrontation.

Giorno is recruited into Bucciarati's team and is introduced to Leone Abbacchio, Guido Mista, Narancia Ghirga, and Pannacotta Fugo. The team goes on a quest to find Polpo's hidden treasure. As Bucciarati is promoted, they are given the task to protect Trish Una and bring her to Passione's mysterious boss, who they're supposed to meet in Venice; on the way there, they fight against the traitorous assassination team who plan to take Trish to find the boss's identity. While fighting against Melone, Giorno discovers the ability to create body parts and use them as a healing ability. In Venice, Bucciarati and Trish go to meet Passione's boss, and Giorno soon realizes they're in mortal danger. Rushing to save them, Giorno learns the boss had sought to kill Trish to sever her genetic tie to him in order to retain his anonymity, and heals Bucciarati, who had been attacked, unaware that the latter is now a living corpse. Giorno and Bucciarati both leave Passione to protect her, and are soon joined by the rest of the team minus Fugo.

After fighting against Passione's elite team and finding a likeness of the boss's face at the cost of Abbachio's life, the team reaches the Colosseum to find the informant that could reveal the identity of the boss. Giorno and the rest find themselves swapped in each other's bodies, with Giorno now residing in Narancia's. They meet the informant, Jean Pierre Polnareff, who explains to them how the Arrow can awaken Stand abilities and allow them to defeat their boss, whose name is revealed to be Diavolo, and how his own awakened Stand, Silver Chariot Requiem, has the sole purpose of safekeeping the Arrow and was responsible for the body swap. After Narancia is killed by Diavolo, Giorno goes back to his original body. Attempting to take the Stand Arrow to provide an advantage against Diavolo, the team finds out that he is residing alongside Trish in Mista's body. As everyone else goes back into their bodies, Bucciarati says his final goodbyes to Giorno and the latter gains the Arrow. Awakening his Stand to Gold Experience Requiem (ゴールド・エクスペリエンス・レクイエム, Gōrudo Ekusuperiensu Rekuiemu), (Note: "Golden Wind Requiem" in official English releases.) Giorno kills and punishes Diavolo by forcing him to live through an endless loop of various deaths. After Diavolo's defeat, Giorno installs himself as the boss of Passione, with Mista and Polnareff by his side.

=== Other appearances ===
Giorno appears as a playable character of the following related games: GioGio's Bizarre Adventure, JoJo's Bizarre Adventure: All-Star Battle, its remake JoJo's Bizarre Adventure: All-Star Battle R, JoJo's Bizarre Adventure: Eyes of Heaven, and JoJo's Bizarre Adventure: Last Survivor. Giorno is also playable in Jump Force as DLC and Puzzle & Dragons in collaborations of the anime and the game's 10th anniversaries from December 26, 2022, to January 9, 2023.

== Cultural impact ==
=== Reception ===
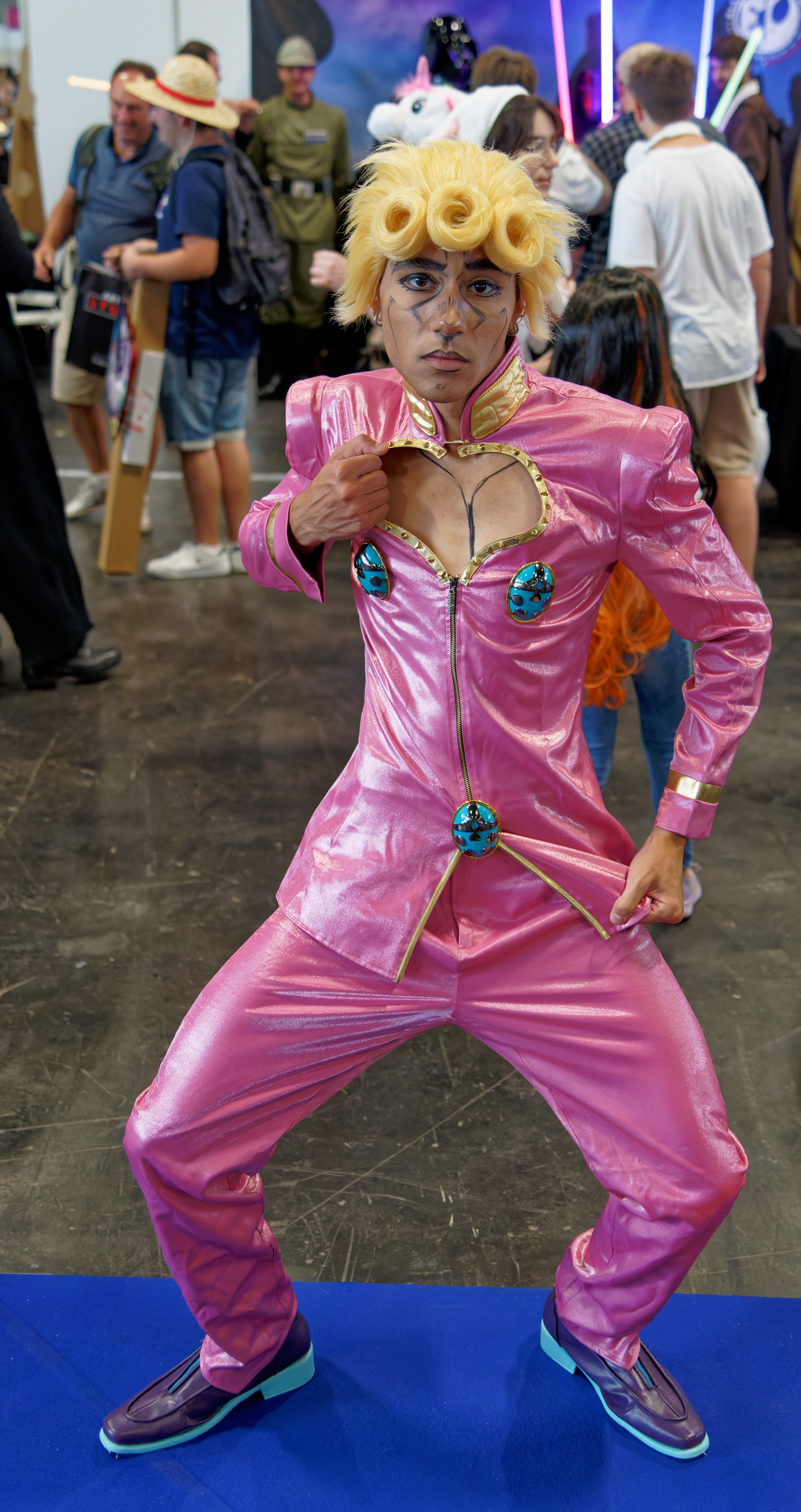
Cosplay of Giorno at Japan Expo 2023

Some critics praised Giorno's ties to both Dio and the Joestar family and his sense of justice despite the vicious side of his personality. Steven Blackburn of Screen Rant praises Golden Wind for making the decision of Giorno of being Dio's son with Joestar blood, as it presents an interesting narrative and how it is in conflict with the Joestars in the early chapters. The reviewer also highlights how Giorno is the only son of Dio's that has an entire part centered around him and that his heroism "serves as a stunning rebuke of Dio's legacy". Jordan Richards of AIPT Comics considers Giorno to be interesting and compelling due to his relation with Dio, his abusive childhood, and how his life-changing of saving a mafia member changes him. The reviewer also notes that while his introduction made him come off as a jerk, his attitude when protecting innocents shows his nobility and appreciates him to be different from the past protagonists. Jenni Lada of Siliconera lauds the first volume of how Giorno is being investigated by Jotaro Kujo and Koichi Hirose provides an interesting premise and that his childhood and heroic, yet criminal qualities make him worth rooting for. Spencer Legacy of Noisy Pixel appreciates how in comparison of Golden Wind 's past fan translations, the official English-translated manga makes him feel more authentic and how he is "much more passionate and memorable here, making him a character worth following". Natasha H. of IGN considers Giorno to be the heart and soul of the story, thinking that he has the best traits of each previous Joestar and him being the son of Dio provides a great contrast. The reviewer also feels that his honorable yet quick-thinking deceitfulness makes him interesting compared to the previous protagonists. Jennifer Sherman of Manga Tokyo praises Kensho Ono's portrayal of Giorno for being powerful and youthful and providing a sense of brightness to the character that none of his previous voice actors the reviewer feels they achieve.

Other critics dislike Giorno's characterization, specifically as Golden Wind reaches its finale. Sam Leach of Anime News Network feels that Giorno is not deserving of his new position as the boss of Passione as the reviewer wants the character to show a little more charisma, resulting in the reviewer believing that it does not hold as much importance as Diavolo's defeat. Moreover, the reviewer felt that in comparison to the characters seen in the part who feel more engaging, Giorno does not hold the same emotional attachment and how his and Diavolo's "legendary battle between obvious good and obvious evil isn't developed enough to serve as a counterbalance to the rest of the cast". Sakaki of Toonami Faithful feels Giorno is a "Jo-bro" of his own part, as the reviewer finds the other characters to be more interesting than him. Reverse Thieves sees Giorno as boring that the reviewer feels Bucciarati is more of a protagonist, citing that Giorno barely gets the time to shine in spite of his backstory, appearance, and ambitions, how he ends up falling flat as a character, and feeling like a plot device providing more as an observer. The reviewer also criticizes his Stand for being complicated whose abilities do not unify as a single power in comparison to Star Platinum and Crazy Diamond's being straightforward and Araki not utilizing some of the cited power-ups. Surreal Resolution thinks that Giorno's characterization does not feel realized, with his familial baggage not being touched upon throughout the story and how wasted it is that Polnareff could not provide any insight on the character due to their connection with Dio.

Critics praised the beatdown against Cioccolata which is seen as a famous and anticipated fight amongst the fandom. Jennifer Sherman also commends Kensho Ono's depiction of Giorno during the scene, calling it amazing that they find the rest of the episode to be a blur. Sam Leach finds it to be one of Giorno's most satisfying victories. David King of Bubbleblabber finds the beatdown to be satisfying in spite of the length in the anime. Katherine Simon of The Ball State Daily believed that David Production delivered the scene, due to its animation of the barrages and Kensho Ono's screams. The reviewer also viewed it as being a fitting end to Cioccolata.

=== Popularity and merchandise ===
Anime Trending reveals Giorno is ranked fourth in the poll of Male Characters Charts in Fall 2018 Anime Season. Giorno was ranked 10th of the craziest hairstyles in Charapedia. Merchandise has been created on Giorno's likeness including a Nendoroid, clothing, sneakers, accessories, watches, fountain pens, wallets, coin purses, card holders, card cases, and chocolates.
