= Bare metal (disambiguation) =

Bare metal is metal that is not coated or painted.

Bare metal may also refer to:

- Bare metal, computer hardware that runs without an operating system
- BareMetal, an exokernel-based computer operating system

== See also ==
- Bare metal arc welding
- Bare-metal stent, in medicine
- Bare-metal restore, in data recovery
- Bare-metal server
