= Metallicus =

Metallicus may refer to:

- Epicus Doomicus Metallicus, an album by Swedish doom metal band Candlemass released in 1986

== See also ==
- Metallica (disambiguation)
