= Metal pair =

Metal pair may refer to:

- Bimetallic strip
- Thermocouple
