= Precious metal (disambiguation) =

A precious metal is a naturally occurring metal of high economic value.

Precious Metal may also refer to:

- Precious Metal (band), an American all-female band from the 1980s featuring Janet Robin
- "Precious Metal", an episode from CSI: Crime Scene Investigation (season 3)
- "Precious Metals", a song by the Canadian indie pop group The Russian Futurists
- Precious Metal (book), a 2009 book by the publishers of Decibel magazine
- Precious Metal (aircraft), a custom-built race plane based on the North American P-51 Mustang
