= Mettle =

Mettle may refer to:

- Mettle, see bravery.

== Music ==
- Mettle (album), 1989 album by Hugo Largo
- "Mettle", a single by Leila from Blood Looms and Blooms
- Icky Mettle, 1993 album by Archers of Loaf

== Other uses ==
- Mettle (character), a Marvel Comics character
- "Mettle" (Spaced), a television episode
- Mettle the Mule, the mascot of the New York Mets
- Joe Mettle, Ghanaian singer-songwriter

== See also ==
- Medal
- Meddle
- Metal
