= Golden Wind (manga) =

Fifth story arc of JoJo's Bizarre Adventure

- JoJo's Bizarre Adventure volume 49 cover. From left to right: Abbacchio, Narancia, Giorno, Bucciarati, Fugo, and Mista

黄金の風 (Ōgon no Kaze)
- Genre: Adventure, supernatural
- Manga
- Written by: Hirohiko Araki
- Published by: Shueisha
- English publisher: NA: Viz Media
- Imprint: Jump Comics
- Magazine: Weekly Shōnen Jump
- Original run: December 11, 1995 – April 5, 1999
- Volumes: 17
- Other media
- Video game (2002); Animated TV series (2018–2019)
- Chronology
- Preceded by: Diamond Is Unbreakable; Followed by: Stone Ocean
- icon

Golden Wind (Japanese: 黄金の風, Hepburn: Ōgon no Kaze), also known as Vento Aureo, is the fifth main story arc of the Japanese manga series JoJo's Bizarre Adventure, written and illustrated by Hirohiko Araki. It was serialized in Shueisha's Weekly Shōnen Jump from December 11, 1995, to April 5, 1999. In its original publication, it was referred to as JoJo's Bizarre Adventure Part 5 Giorno Giovanna: Golden Heritage (ジョジョの奇妙な冒険 第5部 ジョルノ・ジョバァーナ【黄金なる遺産】, JoJo no Kimyō na Bōken Dai Go Bu Joruno Jobāna [Ōgon naru Isan]). Within Golden Wind, the JoJo's Bizarre Adventure title is rendered in Italian, as Le Bizzarre Avventure di GioGio.

Taking place in Italy in the year 2001, the story follows Giorno Giovanna, an illegitimate son of the long-deceased Dio Brando, who aspires to overthrow the boss of the corrupt mafia ruling his hometown of Naples with the aid of a team of fellow Stand users.

As it is the fifth part of the series, its 155 chapters pick up where the fourth left off and are numbered 440 to 594, with the tankōbon volumes numbered 47 to 63. It was preceded by Diamond Is Unbreakable and followed by Stone Ocean. An anime adaptation by David Production, JoJo's Bizarre Adventure: Golden Wind, aired on TV from October 2018 to July 2019. An English hardcover edition of the manga by Viz Media was published in nine omnibus volumes from August 2021 to August 2023.

== Plot ==
In 2001, Koichi Hirose arrives in Naples to investigate a teenager named Haruno Shiobana, who Jotaro Kujo suspects to be the son of Dio Brando. Koichi soon meets and is scammed by Haruno, now going by the name of Giorno Giovanna, whose Stand, Gold Experience, can create lifeforms and heal injuries. A Stand-wielding mafioso by the name of Bruno Bucciarati, seeks to avenge an injury Giorno inflicted on a member of the Passione organisation. Defeated, he finds himself won over by Giorno's dream of becoming Passione's boss in order to better Naples and end the scourge of drug trafficking plaguing the city's youth. He agrees to introduce Giorno to visit an imprisoned capo named Polpo who offers an initiation test involving the indirect use of a Stand Arrow, whose blade either inflicts death or a Stand. After convincing Koichi to cease his investigation, Giorno uses his stand to remotely kill Polpo as revenge for an innocent bystander's death.

Giorno is placed in Bucciarati's group, consisting of fellow Stand users Guido Mista, Leone Abbacchio, Narancia Ghirga and Pannacotta Fugo. Polpo's apparent suicide provides an opening for Bucciarati to achieve the rank of capo by donating Polpo's fortune on the island of Capri to a gang representative. He is then given Polpo's final mission: Passione's boss, a mysterious figure whose identity is unknown to even his subordinates, requests that his daughter Trish Una be brought safely to him in Venice. Along the way, Bucciarati's team eliminates all but one of the members of Passione's team of hitmen, who seek to use Trish as a means to identify and defeat the boss themselves.

On the boss's orders, the group retrieves a key in Pompeii and use it to access a lounge inside of Coco Jumbo, a Stand-wielding turtle. The group uses Coco Jumbo to reach Venice relatively safely, escorting Trish to the Church of San Giorgio Maggiore. Bucciarati fights the boss and his Stand, King Crimson, which can see into and skip through time by up to ten seconds. The position and identity of the boss are obscured while his Stand acts as a mouthpiece for him. Realising he intends to kill his own daughter to maintain his anonymity, Bucciarati chooses to fight but suffers grievous injuries, barely escaping with Trish. Giorno seemingly revives a dead Buccarati with life energy; it is later revealed he is still dying at a rapid rate.

Fugo chooses to remain loyal to the boss out of fear for his life; the remainder of the group defect. They travel to Sardinia after Trish recalls it as the boss's birthplace, hoping to use Abbacchio's Stand, Moody Blues, to uncover his true identity. A man named Vinegar Doppio – who is revealed to be unwitting split personality of the boss – reaches Sardinia first; the boss kills Abbacchio, but before dying, Abbacchio is able to use Moody Blues to create an imprint of the boss's face, which the group later finds. The group are contacted by a third party, who reveals the boss's name as Diavolo and requests that they meet at the Colosseum in Rome to receive a special Arrow.

Diavolo exploits Bucciarati's fading senses to reach the informant first, revealing him as Jean Pierre Polnareff. Diavolo fatally wounds Polnareff, forcing him to stab his own Stand, Silver Chariot, with the Arrow. Polnareff, having seemingly swapped bodies with the turtle, explains that Silver Chariot has evolved into its requiem form: Chariot Requiem, capable of swapping the souls of those in its effective range. Realising that their own Stands will attack them if they approach the Arrow, the group attacks Diavolo (in Buccarati's corpse), but he feints, killing Narancia and leaving Doppio behind to pass away in Bucciarati's corpse. Regardless, he is soon forced to reveal himself, lethally wounding Trish's soul and weakening Requiem.

At the last moment, Bucciarati sacrifices himself to dispel the soul swap, save Trish, and pass the Arrow to Giorno. Giorno uses the arrow to evolve his Stand into Gold Experience Requiem, which has the ability to revert the actions of his opponents, and, to make them experience death infinitely. With this newfound power, Giorno defeats Diavolo and condemns him to an eternal cycle of death, removed from reality. The surviving Trish, Mista and Giorno return to find Polnareff, his soul having survived within the turtle. Giorno and Polnareff agree to preserve the Arrow. Sometime afterward, Giorno becomes the new boss of Passione, with Mista and Polnareff by his side.

== Characters ==
- Giorno Giovanna, (Note: Giorno Giovanna (ジョルノ・ジョバァーナ, Joruno Jobāna; alternatively "Giorno Giovana")) named Haruno Shiobana (Note: Haruno Shiobana (汐華 初流乃, Shiobana Haruno)) at birth, is the human son of Dio Brando. As Dio was in possession of Jonathan Joestar's body at the time Giorno was conceived, Giorno inherits the conviction and righteousness of the Joestar bloodline. Giorno aspires to overthrow Passione's boss, put an end to the practice of selling drugs to children, and restructure the organization into one that helps the people of Italy. Giorno uses the Stand Gold Experience, (Note: Gold Experience (ゴールド・エクスペリエンス, Gōrudo Ekusuperiensu; "Golden Wind" in English releases)) which has the ability to imbue inanimate objects with life, allowing him to create both complete organisms and human body parts. After piercing itself with Polnareff's Arrow, Giorno's Stand evolves into Gold Experience Requiem, (Note: Gold Experience Requiem (ゴールド・エクスペリエンス・レクイエム, Gōrudo Ekusuperiensu Rekuiemu; "Golden Wind Requiem" in English releases)) a Stand that can revert any action, willpower, or state of being back to "zero," effectively nullifying them.
- Bruno Bucciarati (Note: Bruno Bucciarati (ブローノ・ブチャラティ, Burōno Bucharati). The romanization of Burōno Bucharati has changed multiple times since first appearing in print, with "Bruno Bucciarati" and "Blono Buccellati" both being used in official merchandise. "Bruno Bucciarati" is the most recent usage on such merchandise, and is used here.) is the leader of a group within Passione, and is later promoted to caporegime within the gang. He uses the Stand Sticky Fingers, (Note: Sticky Fingers (スティッキィ・フィンガーズ, Sutikkī Fingāzu; "Zipper Man" in English releases)) which can place a zipper on any object, allowing entrance into it. Bucciarati can also use Sticky Fingers to separate objects into smaller objects which can be zipped back together. Following an encounter with Diavolo, Bucciarati spends the remainder of the story as a 'walking corpse,' rendering him nearly immune to damage but gradually depriving him of his senses and life energy. He also appears in the 2012 spin-off Jolyne, Fly High with Gucci.
- Leone Abbacchio (Note: Leone Abbacchio (レオーネ・アバッキオ, Reōne Abakkio)) is a former police officer, and a member of Bucciarati's gang. He is loyal to Bucciarati, being among the first to defect with him. He uses the Stand Moody Blues, (Note: Moody Blues (ムーディー・ブルース, Mūdī Burūsu; "Moody Jazz" in English releases)) which can replay events as a 3D video recording. Abbacchio also appears in Jolyne, Fly High with Gucci.
- Guido Mista (Note: Guido Mista (グイード・ミスタ, Guīdo Misuta)) is a member of Bucciarati's gang. He uses a revolver in tandem with his Stand, Sex Pistols, (Note: Sex Pistols (セックス・ピストルズ, Sekkusu Pisutoruzu; "Six Bullets" in English releases)) which is composed of six small humanoids who can control the bullets Mista shoots. The humanoids are numbered No.1 through No.7, with no No.4 as a result of Mista's crippling tetraphobia. Each of the pistols which make up Mista's stand have their own individual personalities and internal conflicts, which Mista is often forced to resolve.
- Narancia Ghirga (Note: Narancia Ghirga (ナランチャ・ギルガ, Narancha Giruga)) is a member of Bucciarati's gang. He is rather air-headed and somewhat childish, but remains loyal to Bucciarati. He uses the airplane-like Stand, Aerosmith, (Note: Aerosmith (エアロスミス, Earosumisu; "Li'l Bomber" in English releases)) which is equipped with machine guns, bombs and a carbon dioxide radar, allowing him to track down any opponent that breathes.
- Pannacotta Fugo (Note: Pannacotta Fugo (パンナコッタ・フーゴ, Pannakotta Fūgo)) is a member of Bucciarati's gang. Fugo tends to be erratic in mood, often breaking into short bursts of rage. Fugo uses the Stand Purple Haze, (Note: Purple Haze (パープル・ヘイズ, Pāpuru Heizu; "Purple Smoke" in English releases)) which emits a virus that rapidly devours organic matter. Purple Haze is indiscriminate in how its virus affects people, affecting both friends and enemies alike. Fugo is the central character of the novels Golden Heart, Golden Ring and Purple Haze Feedback, which take place after he defects from Bucciarati's group.
- Trish Una (Note: Trish Una (トリッシュ・ウナ, Torisshu Una)) is the daughter of Passione's boss. Following her mother's death, Bucciarati's group is entrusted with the job of protecting her from rival factions within the gang. Eventually, she awakens the Stand Spice Girl, (Note: Spice Girl (スパイス・ガール, Supaisu Gāru; "Spicy Lady" in English releases)) which can increase objects' elasticity to make them nearly indestructible.
- Coco Jumbo (Note: Coco Jumbo (ココ・ジャンボ, Koko Janbo; "Coco Large" in English releases)) is a turtle that gained a Stand. Bucciarati's group is gifted Coco Jumbo by the boss to aid their mission. The turtle's Stand, Mr. President, (Note: Mr. President (ミスター・プレジデント, Misutā Purejidento)) manifests as a miniature hotel room inside of its shell that can be entered and exited freely, allowing its possessors to hide inside and transport themselves within the turtle.
- Jean Pierre Polnareff (Note: Jean Pierre Polnareff (ジャン・ピエール・ポルナレフ, Jan Piēru Porunarefu)) is a French Stand user who traveled alongside Jotaro Kujo and Joseph Joestar to defeat Dio in 1988. Polnareff later discovered Diavolo's true identity, only to be severely injured and left for dead by Passione's boss. After Bucciarati's team betrays the boss, Polnareff contacts the group and offers them a way to defeat the boss: a unique Stand Arrow that allows its user to control souls themselves. Polnareff wields the extremely fast sword-wielding Stand, Silver Chariot. (Note: Silver Chariot (シルバーチャリオッツ, Shirubā Chariottsu)) When Diavolo confronts him, Polnareff is forced to use the Stand Arrow on Silver Chariot and evolve it into Chariot Requiem, (Note: Chariot Requiem (チャリオッツ・レクイエム, Chariottsu Rekuiemu)) which has the ability to swap the souls of living beings and gradually transform them into something else entirely.
- Passione (Note: Passione (パッショーネ, Passhōne)) is the most powerful gang in Italy, controlled by a boss shrouded in secrecy. Passione controls all levels of crime in Italy, from low-level thugs and protective services to extremely powerful hitmen and drug traffickers. The gang's incredible level of power over Italy can be attributed to the unusual number of Stand users found within its members.
  - Diavolo (Note: Diavolo (ディアボロ, Diaboro)) is the boss of Passione, and the father of Trish. He is extremely protective of his identity, intending to kill anyone who threatens his power or his secret, including his own daughter. Diavolo uses the incredibly powerful Stand, King Crimson, (Note: King Crimson (キング・クリムゾン, Kingu Kurimuzon; "Emperor Crimson" in English releases)) which allows him to "erase" a period of time up to ten seconds. While time is "erased," everyone except Diavolo unconsciously carries out their fated actions without regard to his, allowing him to confuse enemies, escape attacks, and land decisive blows. Diavolo is also able to see exactly ten seconds into the future via King Crimson's secondary ability, Epitaph, (Note: Epitaph (エピタフ, Epitafu; "Eulogy" in English releases)) allowing him to predict and "erase" unfortunate outcomes.
  - Vinegar Doppio (Note: Vinegar Doppio (ヴィネガー・ドッピオ, Vinegā Doppio)) is the Boss' younger, more innocent and eccentric underboss. Although he thinks of himself as Diavolo's most trusted subordinate, the two are actually separate souls inhabiting the same body. Diavolo uses Doppio to move around and take action without revealing his identity. Though Doppio does not seem to possess a Stand of his own, he is allowed to wield King Crimson's arms and Epitaph in battle.
  - Polpo (Note: Polpo (ポルポ, Porupo)) is an obese caporegime within Passione who resides in prison for his own protection. After Bucciarati advocates for Giorno, Polpo interviews the youth and tasks him with keeping a lighter lit for twenty-four hours to prove his dedication. Polpo's Stand is Black Sabbath, (Note: Black Sabbath (ブラック・サバス, Burakku Sabasu; "Shadow Sabbath" in English releases)) an auto-tracking Stand that can move within shadows for the sole purpose of piercing those who fail Polpo's test with a Stand Arrow stored in its mouth.
  - The Hitman Team / Execution Squad (La Squadra Esecuzioni) (Note: Hitman Team/Execution Squad (La Squadra Esecuzioni) (暗殺チーム, Ansatsu Chīmu)) is a squad of Stand users within Passione specializing in assassinations. While they previously served under the leadership of Diavolo, their inquiry into Diavolo's identity led to their former boss having two of their members killed. In retaliation, the group swore vengeance against Diavolo and began pursuing his daughter, Trish, in order to discover his identity and kill him. The group serves as the primary group of antagonists in the first half of the story, though its leader remains unseen until the later half.
    - Risotto Nero (Note: Risotto Nero (リゾット・ネエロ, Rizotto Nēro)) is the leader of the La Squadra Esecuzioni. After his cousin was killed by a drunk driver, Risotto tracked down and assassinated the driver. Risotto then joined Passione to protect himself from the police. Although Risotto works in the background during the first half of the story, he eventually attacks Vinegar Doppio after the rest of his teammates are killed. Risotto can control the iron in his surroundings (including iron in the blood of nearby organisms) with his Stand, Metallica. (Note: Metallica (メタリカ, Metarika; "Metallic" in English releases))
    - Formaggio (Note: Formaggio (ホルマジオ, Horumajio)) is the first member of the La Squadra that Bucciarati's team encounters. Suspecting that Trish has been entrusted to Polpo's successor, the assassin decides to pursue Narancia in order to find Trish's whereabouts. Formaggio can shrink any object or creature with his Stand, Little Feet. (Note: Little Feet (リトル・フィート, Ritoru Fito; "Tiny Feet" in English releases))
    - Illuso (Note: Illuso (イルーゾォ, Irūzō)) is the second member of the La Squadra that Bucciarati's team encounters. He ambushes Giorno, Abbacchio, and Fugo in the ruins of Pompeii, eventually learning of and hoping to seize the group's objective. Illuso's Stand, Man in the Mirror, (Note: Man in the Mirror (マン・イン・ザ・ミラー, Man In Za Mirā; "Mirror Man" in English releases)) can transport anyone and anything into and out of a mirror world, separating enemies from their Stands in the process.
    - Prosciutto (Note: Prosciutto (プロシュート, Puroshūto)) is the third member of the La Squadra that Bucciarati's team encounters. He pursues Bucciarati's team aboard a train to Florence alongside his partner Pesci. Though he can be irritable at times, Prosciutto is supportive of his partner and unwavering in his determination to finish his mission. Prosciutto's Stand, The Grateful Dead, (Note: The Grateful Dead (ザ・グレイトフル・デッド, Za Gureitofuru Deddo; "Thankful Death" in English releases)) emits a gas that ages anyone nearby, with the speed of their aging depending on their body temperature.
    - Pesci (Note: Pesci (ペッシ, Pesshi)) is the fourth member of the La Squadra that Bucciarati's team encounters. He attacks Bucciarati's team alongside Prosciutto, who he thinks of as an older brother. Although he acts timid and cowardly at first, Prosciutto's resolve inspires Pesci to become a similarly powerful opponent. Pesci wields the Stand Beach Boy, (Note: Beach Boy (ビーチ・ボーイ, Bīchi Bōi; "Fisher Man" in English releases)) which takes the form of a fishing rod that can pass through anything to hook his targets.
    - Melone (Note: Melone (メローネ, Merōne)) is the fifth member of the La Squadra that Bucciarati's team encounters. He attacks the group as they attempt to reach Venice after Prosciutto's defeat. He is a perverted individual who is easily excited by fortunate events or suitable "mothers". Melone uses the Stand Baby Face, (Note: Baby Face (ベイビィ・フェイス, Beibyi Feisu; "Babyhead" in English releases)) which impregnates a "mother" with a target's DNA and gives birth to a homunculus that automatically pursues and attacks its target. The auto-tracking Stand's personality and abilities are based on the DNA of its "mother"; as a result, Melone can only control it via communication, and his orders may be overruled at any time.
    - Ghiaccio (Note: Ghiaccio (ギアッチョ, Giatcho)) is the sixth and final member of the La Squadra that Bucciarati's team encounters. He pursues Giorno and Mista on the highway to and outskirts of Venice, where the three fight to obtain a disc revealing the boss's location. Ghiaccio is an extremely unstable man who is enraged by useless actions and linguistic inconsistencies. He wields the Stand White Album, (Note: White Album (ホワイト・アルバム, Howaito Arubamu; "White Ice" in English releases)) which takes the form of a full-body suit and produces cryogenic temperatures that freeze anything he touches. White Album allows Ghiaccio to freeze living beings solid, skate across both land and water, and even freeze the air around him by employing its secondary ability, Gently Weeps. (Note: Gently Weeps (ジェントリー・ウィープス, Jentorī Wīpusu))
    - Sorbet (Note: Sorbet (ソルベ, Sorube)) and Gelato (Note: Gelato (ジェラート, Jerāto)) are two members of the La Squadra who are brutally executed by the boss as punishment for looking into his identity. Their deaths spark the Hitman Team's hatred for Diavolo and their desperation to hunt down Trish.
  - Elite Guard Squad (L'Unità Speciale) (Note: Guard Squad (La Unita Speciale) (親衛隊, Shin'eitai)) is an elite team of Stand users within Passione who act as Diavolo's bodyguards, seeking to capture Bucciarati's group dead or alive for their betrayal of the boss.
    - Squalo (Note: Squalo (スクアーロ, Sukuāro)) attacks alongside his partner Tizzano as Bucciarati's group attempts to escape Venice. He wields the shark-like Stand Clash, (Note: Clash (クラッシュ, Kurasshu; "Crush" in English releases)) which can travel within and warp to any nearby body of liquid.
    - Tiziano (Note: Tizzano (ティッツァーノ, Tittsāno)) serves as the methodical foil to his partner, Squalo, who he shares a deep bond with. Tizzano can force others to tell lies with his Stand, Talking Head. (Note: Talking Head (トーキング・ヘッド, Tōkingu Heddo; "Talking Mouth" in English releases))
    - Carne (Note: Carne (カルネ, Karune)) wields the Stand Notorious B.I.G, (Note: Notorious B.I.G (ノトーリアス・B・I・G, Notōriasu Biggu; "Notorious Chase" in English releases)) which chases after and devours the fastest-moving thing in its vicinity, powered only by its user's grudge. After its user's untimely death, Notorious B.I.G lives on as an invincible postmortem Stand.
    - Cioccolata (Note: Cioccolata (チョコラータ, Chokorāta)) is a sadistic doctor who attacks Bucciarati's group in Rome alongside his pet Secco. Believing that curiosity is what pushes humans to grow, he takes great pleasure in recording and replaying his victims' suffering. Cioccolata wields the Stand Green Day, (Note: Green Day (グリーン・ディ, Gurīn Dei; "Green Tea" in English releases)) which produces a mold that rapidly rots anyone in its range if they descend in altitude.
    - Secco (Note: Secco (セッコ, Sēkko)) attacks Bucciarati's group alongside Cioccolata. Though he acts as Cioccolata's pet, Secco reveals his true egocentric nature after his master's death. Secco's Stand, Oasis, (Note: Oasis (オアシス, Oashisu; "Sanctuary" in English releases)) allows him to liquefy and swim through solid matter as though it were mud. Anything within the solid matter, including living beings, will be liquefied as well.
- Koichi Hirose (Note: Koichi Hirose (広瀬 康一, Hirose Kōichi)) is a high school student who arrives in Italy to gain a sample of Giorno Giovanna's DNA, as Jotaro Kujo suspects that the youth is related to Dio. Though Koichi antagonizes Giorno after the latter steals his money and luggage, he ultimately recognizes the youth's righteous nature and decides not to interfere with his dream. Koichi wields the Stand Echoes, (Note: Echoes (エコーズ, Ekōzu; "Reverb" in English releases)) and can utilize any of the three "ACTs" it developed two years prior. He primarily utilizes Echoes ACT3, which has the ability to immobilize objects or people by greatly increasing their weight.
- Scolippi (Note: Scolippi (スコリッピ, Sukorippi)) is a sculptor suspected of murdering his girlfriend, the daughter of a vindictive florist. He is a humble and meek person who holds an absolute belief in fate's inevitability, which he attributes to Michelangelo. Scolippi's Stand, Rolling Stones, (Note: Rolling Stones (ローリング・ストーン(ズ), Rōringu Sutōn(zu); "Prophecy Stones" in English releases)) takes the shape of a nearby person fated to die and follows them; if the target touches the stone, they will be forced to accept an immediate and painless death. Despite being its user, Scolippi has no control over his own Stand, which acts on its own and draws energy from fate.

== Production ==
Hirohiko Araki described the themes of Golden Wind as "human relationships," "friends versus enemies," and "the beauty of betrayal." By depicting the mafia, the author said the story deals with the sadness of having no choice in life or only one place where one belongs: the "dark underbelly of society." Araki also stated that the main focus was to draw "beautiful men" who can only exist in a world where there is "beauty in meeting one's doom." He wanted the characters, sculptures and fashion to be in the style of the Italian city of Rome. The curls in Giorno Giovanna's hair were inspired by Michelangelo's statue David. Araki cited Guido Mista and Prosciutto as characters he enjoyed drawing; the former due to his positive attitude and for being "true to himself without doubts" and the latter for his "brotherly relationship" with his subordinate Pesci and fun Stand power.

== Chapters ==
In the original volumization, chapters 437–439 are a part of Diamond Is Unbreakable.

=== Original volumization (Jump Comics) ===
| No. | Title | Japanese release date | Japanese ISBN |
|---|---|---|---|
| 47 | Goodbye Morioh Town–The Golden Heart; Sayonara Moriō-chō - Ōgon no Kokoro (さよなら杜王町–黄金の心) | May 10, 1996 | 978-4-08-851897-8 |
437. "Let Me Remind You" (思い出させてあげる, Omoidasasete Ageru) (Note: Chapters 437–439 are part of Diamond is Unbreakable and are omitted from this volume in some versions outside Japan.); 438. "Town Guardian Spirits" (町の守護聖霊, Machi no Shugo Seirei); 439. "Goodbye Morioh Town–The Golden Heart" (さよなら杜王町 - 黄金の心, Sayonara Moriōchō - Ōgon no Kokoro); 440–442. "Gold Experience (1–3)" (黄金体験(ゴールド・エクスペリエンス) その①〜③, Gōrudo Ekusuperiensu Sono 1–3); 443–445. "Bucciarati Appears (1–3)" (ブチャラティが来る その①〜③, Bucharati ga Kuru Sono 1–3; lit. 'Bucciarati Is Coming (1–3)')
| 48 | My Dream Is to Be a Gang Star; Boku no Yume wa Gyangu Sutā (ぼくの夢はギャング・スター) | July 4, 1996 | 978-4-08-851898-5 |
446–447. "Bucciarati Appears (4–5)" (ブチャラティが来る その④〜⑤, Bucharati ga Kuru Sono 4–5; lit. 'Bucciarati Is Coming (4–5)'); 448–449. "Meet the Mafioso Behind the Wall (1–2)" (塀の中のギャングに会え その①〜②, Hei no Naka no Gyangu ni Ae Sono 1–2; lit. 'Meet the Gangster Behind the Wall (1-2)'); 450–454. "Joining the Famiglia (1–5)" (ギャング入門 その①〜⑤, Gyangu Nyūmon Sono 1–5; lit. 'Joining the Gang (1-5)')
| 49 | Find Polpo's Fortune! Porupo no Isan o Nerae! (ポルポの遺産を狙え!) | September 4, 1996 | 978-4-08-851899-2 |
455. "Joining the Famiglia (6)" (ギャング入門 その⑥, Gyangu Nyūmon Sono 6; lit. 'Joining the Gang (6)'); 456. "Five Plus One" (5(ファイブ)プラス1(ワン), Faibu Purasu Wan); 457. "Find Polpo's Fortune!" (ポルポの遺産を狙え!, Porupo no Isan o Nerae!); 458–459. "The Secret of Soft Machine (1–2)" (ソフト・マシーンの謎 その①〜②, Sofuto Mashīn no Nazo Sono 1–2); 460–461. "Moody Blues's Counterattack (1–2)" (ムーディー・ブルースの逆襲 その①〜②, Mūdī Burūsu no Gyakushū Sono 1–2); 462–463. "Sex Pistols Appears (1–2)" (セックス・ピストルズ登場 その①〜②, Sekkusu Pisutoruzu Tōjō Sono 1–2)
| 50 | Bucciarati Capo: The First Order from the Boss; Bucharati Kanbu: Bosu kara no Daichi Shirei (ブチャラティ幹部:ボスからの第一指令) | November 1, 1996 | 978-4-08-851119-1 |
464–467. "Sex Pistols Appears (3–6)" (セックス・ピストルズ登場 その③〜⑥, Sekkusu Pisutoruzu Tōjō Sono 3–6); 468. "The 600 Million Yen Stash" (6億円の隠し場所, 6 Oku En no Kakushi Basho); 469. "Bucciarati Capo: The First Order from the Boss" (ブチャラティ幹部:ボスからの第一指令, Bucharati Kanbu: Bosu kara no Daichi Shirei); 470–472. "Narancia's Aerosmith (1–3)" (ナランチャのエアロスミス その①〜③, Narancha no Earosumisu Sono 1–3)
| 51 | The Second Mission from the Boss: "Get the Key!"; Bosu kara no Daini Shirei: "Kī o Getto seyo!" (ボスからの第二指令:「鍵(キー)をゲットせよ!」) | February 4, 1997 | 978-4-08-851120-7 |
473–477. "Narancia's Aerosmith (4–8)" (ナランチャのエアロスミス その④〜⑧, Narancha no Earosumisu Sono 4–8); 478. "The Second Mission from the Boss" (ボスからの第二指令:「鍵(キー)をゲットせよ!」, Bosu kara no Daini Shirei: 'Kī o Getto seyo!'; lit. 'The Second Mission from the Boss: 'Get the Key!''); 479–481. "Man in the Mirror and Purple Haze (1–3)" (マン・イン・ザ・ミラーとパープル・ヘイズ その①〜③, Man In Za Mirā to Pāpuru Heizu Sono 1–3)
| 52 | Express Train to Florence; Firentse Iki Chōtokkyū (フィレンツェ行き超特急) | April 4, 1997 | 978-4-08-872039-5 |
482–485. "Man in the Mirror and Purple Haze (4–7)" (マン・イン・ザ・ミラーとパープル・ヘイズ その④〜⑦, Man In Za Mirā to Pāpuru Heizu Sono 4–7); 486–487. "Il Treno Espresso per Firenze (1–2)" (フィレンツェ行き超特急 その①〜②, Firentse Iki Chōtokkyū Sono 1–2; lit. 'Express Train to Florence (1-2)'); 488–490. "The Grateful Dead (1–3)" (偉大なる死(ザ・グレイトフル・デッド) その①〜③, Za Gureitofuru Deddo Sono 1–3)
| 53 | The Grateful Dead; Za Gureitofuru Deddo (偉大なる死(ザ・グレイトフル・デッド)) | June 4, 1997 | 978-4-08-872040-1 |
491–499. "The Grateful Dead (4–12)" (偉大なる死(ザ・グレイトフル・デッド) その④〜⑫, Za Gureitofuru Deddo Sono 4–12)
| 54 | Gold Experience's Counterattack; Gōrudo Ekusuperiensu no Gyakushū (ゴールド・エクスペリエンスの逆襲) | September 4, 1997 | 978-4-08-872174-3 |
500–506. "Baby Face (1–7)" (ベイビィ・フェイス その①〜⑦, Beibii Feisu Sono 1–7); 507. "Verso Venezia!" (ヴェネツィアに向かえ!, Venetsia ni Mukae!; lit. 'Head to Venice!'); 508. "Retrieve the OA-Disc at Santa Lucia Station!" (ヴェネツィア・サンタ・ルチア駅 『OA-DISC』をゲットせよ!, Venetsia Santa Ruchia Eki ŌĒ-Disuku o Getto seyo!)
| 55 | The Venice Landing Operation; Venetsia Jōriku Sakusen (ヴェネツィア上陸作戦) | November 4, 1997 | 978-4-08-872175-0 |
509–515. "White Album (1–7)" (ホワイト・アルバム その①〜⑦, Howaito Arubamu Sono 1–7); 516. "The Final Orders from the Boss" (ボスよりの最終指令, Bosu yori no Saishū Shirei); 517. "Bruno Bucciarati's Childhood" (ブローノ・ブチャラティ その少年時代, Burōno Bucharati Sono Shōnen Jidai)
| 56 | The "G" in Guts "Gattsu no 'Jī'" (ガッツの「G」) | January 9, 1998 | 978-4-08-872501-7 |
518–523. "The Mystery of King Crimson (1–6)" (キング・クリムゾンの謎 その①〜⑥, Kingu Kurimuzon no Nazo Sono 1–6); 524. "The 'G' in Gozzo" (ガッツの「G」, Gattsu no 'Jī'; lit. 'The 'G' in Guts'); 525–526. "Clash and Talking Head (1–2)" (クラッシュとトーキング・ヘッド その①〜②, Kurasshu to Tōkingu Heddo Sono 1–2)
| 57 | No Flightcode! Unearth the Boss's Past; Furaito Kōdo Nashi! Bosu no Kako o Abake (フライト・コードなし! ボスの過去をあばけ) | March 4, 1998 | 978-4-08-872526-0 |
527–531. "Clash and Talking Head (3–7)" (クラッシュとトーキング・ヘッド その③〜⑦, Kurasshu to Tōkingu Heddo Sono 3–7); 532. "Unscheduled Departure for Sardinia" (フライト・コードなし! サルディニアへ向かえ, Furaito Kōdo Nashi! Sarudinia e Mukae; lit. 'No Flightcode! Headed for Sardinia'); 533–535. "Notorious B.I.G (1–3)" (ノトーリアス・B・I・G(ビッグ) その①〜③, Notōriasu Biggu Sono 1–3)
| 58 | My Name Is Doppio; Boku no Na wa Doppio (ぼくの名はドッピオ) | June 4, 1998 | 978-4-08-872562-8 |
536–538. "Notorious B.I.G (4–6)" (ノトーリアス・B・I・G(ビッグ) その④〜⑥, Notōriasu Biggu Sono 4–6); 539–540. "Spice Girl (1–2)" (スパイス・ガール その①〜②, Supaisu Gāru Sono 1–2); 541. "A Storm Warning in Sardinia" (サルディニア島嵐警報!, Sarudinia-tō Arashi Keihō!; lit. 'Storm Warning in Sardinia Island!'); 542–543. "My Name Is Doppio (1–2)" (ぼくの名はドッピオ その①〜②, Boku no Na wa Doppio Sono 1–2); 544. "King Crimson vs. Metallica (1)" (キング・クリムゾンv.s.(バーサス)メタリカ その①, Kingu Kurimuzon Bāsasu Metarika Sono 1)
| 59 | Under a Sky That Could Come Falling Any Minute; Ima ni mo Ochite Kisō na Sora no Shita de (今にも落ちて来そうな空の下で) | August 4, 1998 | 978-4-08-872588-8 |
545–549. "King Crimson vs. Metallica (2–6)" (キング・クリムゾンv.s.(バーサス)メタリカ その②〜⑥, Kingu Kurimuzon Bāsasu Metarika Sono 2–6); 550. "Under a Sky That Could Come Falling Any Minute" (今にも落ちて来そうな空の下で, Ima ni mo Ochite Kisō na Sora no Shita de); 551–552. "Pronto! On the Phone (1–2)" (プロント(もしもし)! 通話中 その①〜②, Moshimoshi! Tsūwachū Sono 1–2); 553. "Get to the Colosseum in Rome!" (目的地はローマ! コロッセオ, Mokutekichi wa Rōma! Korosseo; lit. 'Destination: Rome! The Colosseum')
| 60 | Meet the Man in the Colosseum! Korosseo no Otoko ni Ae! (コロッセオの男に会え!) | October 2, 1998 | 978-4-08-872613-7 |
554–562. "Green Day and Oasis (1–9)" (『グリーン・ディ』と『オアシス』 その①〜⑨, Gurīn Di to Oashisu Sono 1–9)
| 61 | His Name Is Diavolo; Soitsu no Na wa Diaboro (そいつの名はディアボロ) | January 8, 1999 | 978-4-08-872652-6 |
563–567. "Green Day and Oasis (10–14)" (『グリーン・ディ』と『オアシス』 その⑩〜⑭, Gurīn Di to Oashisu Sono 10–14); 568. "His Name Is Diavolo (1)" (そいつの名はディアボロ その①, Soitsu no Na wa Diaboro Sono 1); 569. "A Little Story from the Past" (ほんの少し昔の物語, Honno Sukoshi Mukashi no Monogatari); 570. "His Name Is Diavolo (2)" (そいつの名はディアボロ その②, Soitsu no Na wa Diaboro Sono 2); 571. "Beyond the Arrow" (「矢」のさらに先に存在(ある)もの, Ya no Sara ni Saki ni Aru Mono; lit. 'What Lies Beyond the Arrow')
| 62 | The Requiem Quietly Plays; Rekuiemu wa Shizuka ni Kanaderareru (鎮魂歌(レクイエム)は静かに奏でられる) | March 4, 1999 | 978-4-08-872680-9 |
572–579. "The Requiem Quietly Plays (1–8)" (鎮魂歌(レクイエム)は静かに奏でられる その①〜⑧, Rekuiemu wa Shizuka ni Kanaderareru Sono 1–8); 580–582. "Diavolo Surfaces (1–3)" (ディアボロ浮上 その①〜③, Diaboro Fujō Sono 1–3)
| 63 | The Sleeping Slave; Nemureru Dorei (眠れる奴隷) | April 30, 1999 | 978-4-08-872709-7 |
583–584. "Diavolo Surfaces (4–5)" (ディアボロ浮上 その④〜⑤, Diaboro Fujō Sono 4–5); 585. "King of Kings" (王の中の王(キング・オブ・キングス), Kingu Obu Kingusu); 586–589. "Gold Experience Requiem (1–4)" (ゴールド・E(エクスペリエンス)・レクイエム その①〜④, Gōrudo Ekusuperiensu Rekuiemu Sono 1–4) (Note: Chapters 589 and 590 were released as one chapter in Weekly Shōnen Jump.); 590. "Epilogue, The Sleeping Slave" (エピローグ 「眠れる奴隷」, Epirōgu Nemureru Dorei); 591–594. "The Sleeping Slave (2–5)" (眠れる奴隷 その②〜⑤, Nemureru Dorei Sono 2–5)

=== 2005 release (Shueisha Bunko) ===
| No. | Title | Japanese release date | Japanese ISBN |
|---|---|---|---|
| 30 | Parte 5: Vento Aureo 1 Parte 5 Ōgon no Kaze 1 (Parte5 黄金の風 1) | March 18, 2005 | 4-08-618301-3 |
Chapters 440–454
| 31 | Parte 5: Vento Aureo 2 Parte 5 Ōgon no Kaze 2 (Parte5 黄金の風 2) | March 18, 2005 | 4-08-618302-1 |
Chapters 455–469
| 32 | Parte 5: Vento Aureo 3 Parte 5 Ōgon no Kaze 3 (Parte5 黄金の風 3) | May 18, 2005 | 4-08-618303-X |
Chapters 470–485
| 33 | Parte 5: Vento Aureo 4 Parte 5 Ōgon no Kaze 4 (Parte5 黄金の風 4) | May 18, 2005 | 4-08-618304-8 |
Chapters 486–500
| 34 | Parte 5: Vento Aureo 5 Parte 5 Ōgon no Kaze 5 (Parte5 黄金の風 5) | June 17, 2005 | 4-08-618305-6 |
Chapters 501–516
| 35 | Parte 5: Vento Aureo 6 Parte 5 Ōgon no Kaze 6 (Parte5 黄金の風 6) | June 17, 2005 | 4-08-618306-4 |
Chapters 517–531
| 36 | Parte 5: Vento Aureo 7 Parte 5 Ōgon no Kaze 7 (Parte5 黄金の風 7) | July 15, 2005 | 4-08-618307-2 |
Chapters 532–547
| 37 | Parte 5: Vento Aureo 8 Parte 5 Ōgon no Kaze 8 (Parte5 黄金の風 8) | July 15, 2005 | 4-08-618308-0 |
Chapters 548–562
| 38 | Parte 5: Vento Aureo 9 Parte 5 Ōgon no Kaze 9 (Parte5 黄金の風 9) | August 10, 2005 | 4-08-618309-9 |
Chapters 563–577
| 39 | Parte 5: Vento Aureo 10; Parte 5 Ōgon no Kaze 10 (Parte5 黄金の風 10) | August 10, 2005 | 4-08-618310-2 |
Chapters 578–594

=== English release ===
| No. | English release date | English ISBN |
|---|---|---|
| 1 (27) (Note: Continuing from the English JoJonium releases of Parts 1–3 and the hardcover release of Part 4.) | August 3, 2021 | 978-1-9747-2349-2 |
Chapters 1-15
| 2 (28) | November 2, 2021 | 978-1-9747-2399-7 |
Chapters 16-33
| 3 (29) | February 1, 2022 | 978-1-9747-2411-6 |
Chapters 34-51
| 4 (30) | May 24, 2022 | 978-1-9747-2412-3 |
Chapters 52-69
| 5 (31) | August 23, 2022 | 978-1-9747-2413-0 |
Chapters 70-87
| 6 (32) | November 22, 2022 | 978-1-9747-2414-7 |
Chapters 88-105
| 7 (33) | February 28, 2023 | 978-1-9747-2415-4 |
Chapters 106-123
| 8 (34) | May 23, 2023 | 978-1-9747-2416-1 |
Chapters 124-140
| 9 (35) | August 22, 2023 | 978-1-9747-2417-8 |
Chapters 141-155

== Related media ==
=== Anime ===
The anime adaptation of Golden Wind was announced by series creator Hirohiko Araki at the "Ripples of Adventure" art exhibition on June 21, 2018, and premiered the first episode at Anime Expo on July 5, 2018. The anime adaptation by David Production aired from October 5, 2018, to July 28, 2019, as part of their JoJo's Bizarre Adventure anime television series. Golden Wind was directed by returning series director Naokatsu Tsuda who was accompanied by the senior writer Yasuko Kobayashi. The character designer for Golden Wind was Takahiro Kishida, and the animation director was Shun'ichi Ishimoto. Yugo Kanno returned as composer from previous seasons. The series ran for 39 episodes.

=== Novels ===
The novel Le Bizzarre Avventure di GioGio II: Golden Heart/Golden Ring (Note: Le Bizzarre Avventure di GioGio II: Golden Heart/Golden Ring (ジョジョの奇妙な冒険 II ゴールデンハート/ゴールデンリング, Jojo no Kimyō na Bōken Ni Gōruden Hāto/Gōruden Ringu)) was written by Gichi Ōtsuka and Miya Shōtarō, and released on May 28, 2001. An Italian translation was released in 2004. A second novel, Purple Smoke Distortion, (Note: Purple Haze Feedback (恥知らずのパープルヘイズ -ジョジョの奇妙な冒険より-, Hajishirazu Pāpuru Heizu -JoJo no Kimyō na Bōken yori-; literally "Shameless Purple Haze")) was written by Kouhei Kadono and released on September 16, 2011. Viz Media will publish it in North America in spring 2026.

=== Video game ===
The PlayStation 2 video game GioGio's Bizarre Adventure was released in Japan in 2002, adapting the arc.

== Reception ==
In a 2018 survey of 17,000 JoJo's Bizarre Adventure fans, Golden Wind was chosen as the favorite story arc with 19.1% of the vote.

Both Screen Rant's Steven Blackburn and Jordan Richards of AIPT Comics called Golden Wind a breath of fresh air for JoJo's Bizarre Adventure by deviating from the basic formula and following Giorno, son of villain Dio Brando, as he looks to cement a reputation and build a criminal empire. Jenni Lada of Siliconera also praised the protagonist Giorno and said the first volume of Golden Wind shows how skilled Araki is at getting people quickly invested in a character and story. She wrote, by giving readers a look at Giorno's past and insights into the person he is now, it emphasizes why he is compelling; "We're introduced to his dream and see him take his first steps toward it." Richards wrote that Part 5's vivid and imaginative Stand fights continue JoJo's Bizarre Adventure's "wholly unique" style of art not seen in any other series. However, despite calling the supporting cast a memorable bunch, Richards felt they were underdeveloped as of the first volume, but noted they had potential.
