= List of JoJo's Bizarre Adventure episodes =

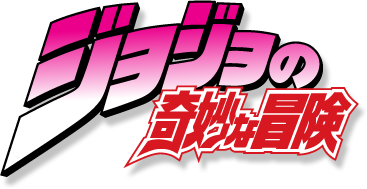

JoJo's Bizarre Adventure (Note: Also known as JoJo's Bizarre Adventure: The Animation to better differentiate from the manga) is an anime television series based on the manga series JoJo's Bizarre Adventure by Hirohiko Araki, which was serialized in Weekly Shōnen Jump from 1987 to 2004, and later transferred into the monthly seinen manga magazine Ultra Jump in 2005. The series focuses on the bizarre adventures of the Joestar family across multiple generations, from the end of the 19th century to modern times, even through a separate continuity beyond the sixth part. The series was first broadcast on Tokyo MX before entering syndication on four Japan News Network (JNN) stations, BS11, and Animax.

The first season, adapting the first two parts, Phantom Blood and Battle Tendency, aired in Japan between October 2012 and April 2013. The series is distributed in North America by Warner Home Video and Viz Media, with the former handling the series on DVD and the latter handling the series on Blu-Ray and the merchandising rights. In the United States, it aired on Adult Swim's Toonami programming block starting in October 2016.

A second season covering the third part, Stardust Crusaders, was divided in two parts, the first airing between April and September 2014, and the second between January and June 2015.

A third season covering the fourth part, Diamond Is Unbreakable, aired from April to December 2016.

A fourth season covering the fifth part, Golden Wind, aired from October 2018 to July 2019.

A fifth season covering the sixth part, Stone Ocean, debuted worldwide on Netflix. It was divided and released in three parts: the first in December 2021, the second in September 2022 and the third and final in December of the same year. In Japan, this was followed up with a televised run beginning in January 2022.

A sixth season covering the seventh part, Steel Ball Run, was announced at the JoJoDay promotional event held in Tokyo in April 2025. The season premiered its first episode on Netflix on March 19, 2026. The next cours, which will consist of 11 episodes each, begun streaming weekly on September 25 of the same year.

== Series overview ==
Season	Episodes		Originally released		Part
Season	Episodes		First released	Last released	Part
1	26	9	October 6, 2012	December 1, 2012	Phantom Blood Battle Tendency
1	26	17	December 8, 2012	April 6, 2013	Phantom Blood Battle Tendency
2	48	24	April 5, 2014	September 13, 2014	Stardust Crusaders
2	48	24	January 10, 2015	June 20, 2015	Stardust Crusaders
3	39		April 6, 2016	December 24, 2016	Diamond Is Unbreakable
4	39		October 6, 2018	July 28, 2019	Golden Wind
5	38	12	December 1, 2021		Stone Ocean
5	38	12	September 1, 2022		Stone Ocean
5	38	14	December 1, 2022		Stone Ocean
6	TBA	1	March 19, 2026		Steel Ball Run
6	TBA	11	September 25, 2026	TBA	Steel Ball Run

== Episodes ==
=== Season 1: Phantom Blood & Battle Tendency (2012–2013) ===
No. overall (Note: Order of episodes in both the series and season)	No. in part (Note: Order of episodes within the part)	Title	Directed by	Written by	Storyboarded by	Original release date (Note: Tokyo MX lists the series as premiering at 24:30 on Friday, which is effectively Saturday at 12:30 a.m. JST.)	English air date (Note: All episodes of the first season were initially released in English on home media on September 22, 2015, but to correspond with the Japanese column, the air dates here will refer to their first English television airings on Adult Swim's Toonami programming block.)
Phantom Blood
1	1	"Dio the Invader"; Transliteration: "Shinryaku-sha Dio" (Japanese: 侵略者ディオ)	Kōta Okuno	Yasuko Kobayashi	Naokatsu Tsuda	October 6, 2012	October 16, 2016
2	2	"A Letter from the Past"; Transliteration: "Kako kara no Tegami" (Japanese: 過去からの手紙)	Toshiyuki Katō	Yasuko Kobayashi	Toshiyuki Katō	October 13, 2012	October 23, 2016
3	3	"Youth with Dio"; Transliteration: "Dio to no Seishun" (Japanese: ディオとの青春)	Futoshi Higashide	Yasuko Kobayashi	Futoshi Higashide	October 20, 2012	November 6, 2016
4	4	"Overdrive"; Transliteration: "Ōbādoraibu" (Japanese: 波紋疾走(オーバードライブ))	Masashi Abe	Shōgo Yasukawa	Masashi Abe	October 27, 2012	November 13, 2016
5	5	"The Dark Knights"; Transliteration: "Ankoku no Kishi-tachi" (Japanese: 暗黒の騎士達)	Mitsuhiro Yoneda & Hitomi Ezoe	Kazuyuki Fudeyasu	Toshifumi Takizawa	November 3, 2012	November 20, 2016
6	6	"Tomorrow's Courage"; Transliteration: "Ashita no Yūki" (Japanese: あしたの勇気)	Shingo Uchida	Kazuyuki Fudeyasu	Taizō Yoshida	November 10, 2012	November 27, 2016
7	7	"Sorrowful Successor"; Transliteration: "Uketsugu-mono" (Japanese: うけ継ぐ者)	Toshiyuki Katō	Shōgo Yasukawa	Toshiyuki Katō	November 17, 2012	December 4, 2016
8	8	"Bloody Battle! JoJo & Dio"; Transliteration: "Kessen! JoJo to Dio" (Japanese: 血戦！JOJO &(と) DIO)	Jirō Fujimoto	Yasuko Kobayashi	Toshifumi Takizawa	November 24, 2012	December 11, 2016
9	9	"The Final Ripple!"; Transliteration: "Saigo no Hamon!" (Japanese: 最後の波紋！)	Kenichi Suzuki	Yasuko Kobayashi	Kenichi Suzuki	December 1, 2012	December 18, 2016
Battle Tendency
10	1	"New York's JoJo"; Transliteration: "Nyū Yōku no JoJo" (Japanese: ニューヨークのジョジョ)	Takahiro Majima	Yasuko Kobayashi	Taizō Yoshida	December 8, 2012	December 18, 2016
11	2	"The Game Master"; Transliteration: "Gēmu no Tatsujin" (Japanese: ゲームの達人)	Mitsuhiro Yoneda	Shinichi Inotsume	Mitsuhiro Yoneda	December 15, 2012	January 8, 2017
12	3	"The Pillar Man"; Transliteration: "Hashira no Otoko" (Japanese: 柱の男)	Yukio Nishimoto	Kazuyuki Fudeyasu	Yukio Nishimoto	December 22, 2012	January 15, 2017
13	4	"JoJo vs. the Ultimate Lifeform"; Transliteration: "JoJo tai Kyūkyoku Seibutsu" (Japanese: JOJO vs.(たい) 究極生物)	Yasuhiro Minami & Kenichi Suzuki	Shōgo Yasukawa	Futoshi Higashide	January 5, 2013	January 22, 2017
14	5	"Ultimate Warriors from Ancient Times"; Transliteration: "Taiko kara Kita Kyūkyoku Senshi" (Japanese: 太古から来た究極戦士)	Toshiyuki Katō	Shōgo Yasukawa	Toshiyuki Katō	January 12, 2013	January 29, 2017
15	6	"A Hero's Proof"; Transliteration: "Hīrō no Shikaku" (Japanese: ヒーローの資格)	Masaya Sasaki	Shōgo Yasukawa	Taizō Yoshida	January 19, 2013	February 5, 2017
16	7	"Lisa Lisa, Hamon Coach"; Transliteration: "Hamon Kyōshi Risa Risa" (Japanese: 波紋教師リサリサ)	Kōtarō Togoshi	Kazuyuki Fudeyasu	Kōtarō Togoshi	January 26, 2013	February 12, 2017
17	8	"The Deeper Plan"; Transliteration: "Fukaku Wana o Hare!" (Japanese: 深く罠をはれ！)	Yūta Takamura	Kazuyuki Fudeyasu	Taizō Yoshida	February 2, 2013	February 19, 2017
18	9	"Von Stroheim's Revenge"; Transliteration: "Shutorohaimu-tai no Gyakushū" (Japanese: シュトロハイム隊の逆襲)	Shingo Uchida & Mitsuhiro Yoneda	Shinichi Inotsume	Shingo Uchida	February 9, 2013	February 26, 2017
19	10	"A Race Toward the Brink"; Transliteration: "Shi no Gake e Tsuppashire" (Japanese: 死の崖へつっ走れ)	Masashi Abe	Shinichi Inotsume	Masashi Abe	February 16, 2013	March 5, 2017
20	11	"Young Caesar"; Transliteration: "Shīzā Kodoku no Seishun" (Japanese: シーザー孤独の青春)	Toshiyuki Katō	Yasuko Kobayashi	Toshiyuki Katō	February 23, 2013	March 12, 2017
21	12	"A Hundred Against Two"; Transliteration: "Hyaku tai Ni no Kakehiki" (Japanese: 100(ひゃく)対2(に)のかけひき)	Hitomi Ezoe	Shōgo Yasukawa	Hitomi Ezoe & Yukio Nishimoto	March 2, 2013	March 19, 2017
22	13	"A True Warrior"; Transliteration: "Shin no Kakutō-sha" (Japanese: 真の格闘者)	Naomi Nakayama	Shinichi Inotsume	Shin Misawa	March 9, 2013	March 26, 2017
23	14	"The Warrior of Wind"; Transliteration: "Kaze ni Kaeru Senshi" (Japanese: 風にかえる戦士)	Jirō Fujimoto	Kazuyuki Fudeyasu	Taizō Yoshida	March 16, 2013	April 2, 2017
24	15	"The Ties That Bind JoJo"; Transliteration: "JoJo o Musubu Kizuna" (Japanese: JOJOを結ぶ絆)	Satoshi Ōsedo	Yasuko Kobayashi	Satoshi Ōsedo	March 23, 2013	April 9, 2017
25	16	"The Birth of a Superbeing"; Transliteration: "Chō Seibutsu no Tanjō!!" (Japanese: 超生物の誕生!!)	Kenichi Suzuki	Yasuko Kobayashi	Kenichi Suzuki	March 30, 2013	April 16, 2017
26	17	"The Ascendant One"; Transliteration: "Kami to Natta Otoko" (Japanese: 神となった男)	Toshiyuki Katō	Yasuko Kobayashi	Toshiyuki Katō	April 6, 2013	April 16, 2017

=== Season 2: Stardust Crusaders (2014–2015) ===
No. overall (Note: Order of episodes in the series continuing from the previous season)	No. in season (Note: Order of episodes within the season)	Title (Note: English episode titles are taken from Crunchyroll. In instances where names are altered from the Japanese version, the original Japanese translation is used on the left while the edited Crunchyroll title is used on the right.)	Storyboarded by	Directed by	Written by	Original release date	English air date (Note: Adult Swim lists the series as premiering at 12:00 a.m. ET/PT on Saturday, which is effectively Sunday.)
Stardust Crusaders
27	1	"The Man Possessed by an Evil Spirit"; Transliteration: "Akuryō ni Toritsukareta Otoko" (Japanese: 悪霊にとりつかれた男)	Naokatsu Tsuda	Naokatsu Tsuda	Yasuko Kobayashi	April 5, 2014	July 30, 2017
28	2	"Who Will Be the Judge!?"; Transliteration: "Sabaku no wa Dare da!?" (Japanese: 裁くのは誰だ!?)	Naokatsu Tsuda	Yūta Takamura	Yasuko Kobayashi	April 12, 2014	August 6, 2017
29	3	"The Curse of Dio"; Transliteration: "Dio no Jubaku" (Japanese: Dioの呪縛)	Toshiyuki Katō	Toshiyuki Katō	Yasuko Kobayashi	April 19, 2014	August 13, 2017
30	4	"Tower of Gray"; Transliteration: "Tawā Obu Gurē" (Japanese: 灰の塔(タワー・オブ・グレー))	Taizō Yoshida	Jirō Fujimoto	Shōgo Yasukawa	April 26, 2014	August 20, 2017
31	5	"Silver Chariot"; Transliteration: "Shirubā Chariottsu" (Japanese: 銀の戦車(シルバーチャリオッツ))	Ken'ichi Suzuki	Ken'ichi Suzuki	Yasuko Kobayashi	May 3, 2014	August 27, 2017
32	6	"Dark Blue Moon"; Transliteration: "Dāku Burū Mūn" (Japanese: 暗青の月(ダークブルームーン))	Hirofumi Ogura	Hirofumi Ogura	Shin'ichi Inotsume	May 10, 2014	September 10, 2017
33	7	"Strength"; Transliteration: "Sutorengusu" (Japanese: 力(ストレングス))	Mitsuhiro Yoneda	Mitsuhiro Yoneda	Kazuyuki Fudeyasu	May 17, 2014	September 17, 2017
34	8	"The Devil"; Transliteration: "Debiru" (Japanese: 悪魔(デビル))	Yasufumi Soejima	Yasufumi Soejima	Shin'ichi Inotsume	May 24, 2014	September 24, 2017
35	9	"Yellow Temperance"; Transliteration: "Ierō Tenparansu" (Japanese: 黄の節制(イエローテンパランス))	Masashi Abe	Jirō Fujimoto, Hitomi Ezoe	Kazuyuki Fudeyasu	May 31, 2014	October 1, 2017
36	10	"The Emperor and the Hanged Man, Part 1"; Transliteration: "Enperā to Hangudoman Sono 1" (Japanese: 皇帝(エンペラー)と吊られた男(ハングドマン) その1)	Toshiyuki Katō	Toshiyuki Katō	Yasuko Kobayashi	June 7, 2014	October 8, 2017
37	11	"The Emperor and the Hanged Man, Part 2"; Transliteration: "Enperā to Hangudoman Sono 2" (Japanese: 皇帝(エンペラー)と吊られた男(ハングドマン) その2)	Toshiyuki Katō	Shunsuke Machitani, Toshiyuki Katō	Yasuko Kobayashi	June 14, 2014	October 15, 2017
38	12	"The Empress"; Transliteration: "Enpuresu" (Japanese: 女帝(エンプレス))	Satoshi Ōsedo	Satoshi Ōsedo	Shōgo Yasukawa	June 21, 2014	October 22, 2017
39	13	"Wheel of Fortune"; Transliteration: "Howīru Obu Fōchun" (Japanese: 運命の車輪(ホウィール・オブ・フォーチュン))	Rei Nakahara	Jin Tamamura	Shōgo Yasukawa	June 28, 2014	November 5, 2017
40	14	"Justice, Part 1"; Transliteration: "Jasutisu Sono 1" (Japanese: 正義(ジャスティス) その1)	Hirofumi Ogura	Hirokazu Yamada	Shin'ichi Inotsume	July 5, 2014	November 12, 2017
41	15	"Justice, Part 2"; Transliteration: "Jasutisu Sono 2" (Japanese: 正義(ジャスティス) その2)	Hirofumi Ogura	Hirofumi Ogura	Shin'ichi Inotsume	July 12, 2014	November 19, 2017
42	16	"The Lovers, Part 1"; Transliteration: "Rabāzu Sono 1" (Japanese: 恋人(ラバーズ) その1)	Taizō Yoshida	Shunsuke Machitani, Hitomi Ezoe	Kazuyuki Fudeyasu	July 19, 2014	December 3, 2017
43	17	"The Lovers, Part 2"; Transliteration: "Rabāzu Sono 2" (Japanese: 恋人(ラバーズ) その2)	Jirō Fujimoto	Jirō Fujimoto	Kazuyuki Fudeyasu	July 26, 2014	December 10, 2017
44	18	"The Sun"; Transliteration: "San" (Japanese: 太陽(サン))	Naokatsu Tsuda	Yasufumi Soejima	Naokatsu Tsuda	August 2, 2014	December 17, 2017
45	19	"Death 13, Part 1"; Transliteration: "Desu Sātīn Sono 1" (Japanese: 死神13(デスサーティーン) その1)	Toshiyuki Katō	Toshiyuki Katō	Shōgo Yasukawa	August 9, 2014	January 7, 2018
46	20	"Death 13, Part 2"; Transliteration: "Desu Sātīn Sono 2" (Japanese: 死神13(デスサーティーン) その2)	Toshiyuki Katō	Naokatsu Tsuda, Shigatsu Yoshikawa	Shōgo Yasukawa	August 16, 2014	January 14, 2018
47	21	"Judgement, Part 1"; Transliteration: "Jajjimento Sono 1" (Japanese: 審判(ジャッジメント) その1)	Taizō Yoshida	Yūta Takamura	Yasuko Kobayashi	August 23, 2014	January 21, 2018
48	22	"Judgement, Part 2"; Transliteration: "Jajjimento Sono 2" (Japanese: 審判(ジャッジメント) その2)	Yasufumi Soejima	Hitomi Ezoe, Ken'ichi Suzuki	Yasuko Kobayashi	August 30, 2014	January 28, 2018
49	23	"High Priestess, Part 1"; Transliteration: "Hai Puriesutesu Sono 1" (Japanese: 女教皇(ハイプリエステス) その1)	Satoshi Ōsedo	Satoshi Ōsedo	Shin'ichi Inotsume	September 6, 2014	February 4, 2018
50	24	"High Priestess, Part 2"; Transliteration: "Hai Puriesutesu Sono 2" (Japanese: 女教皇(ハイプリエステス) その2)	Naokatsu Tsuda	Shunsuke Machitani, Naokatsu Tsuda	Shin'ichi Inotsume	September 13, 2014	February 11, 2018
Stardust Crusaders: Battle in Egypt
51	25	"Iggy the Fool and Geb's N'Doul, Part 1"; Transliteration: "'Za Fūru' no Igī to 'Gebu-shin' no Ndūru Sono 1" (Japanese: 「愚者(ザ・フール)」のイギーと「ゲブ神」のンドゥール その1)	Ken'ichi Suzuki	Ken'ichi Suzuki	Yasuko Kobayashi	January 10, 2015	February 18, 2018
52	26	"Iggy the Fool and Geb's N'Doul, Part 2"; Transliteration: "'Za Fūru' no Igī to 'Gebu-shin' no Ndūru Sono 2" (Japanese: 「愚者(ザ・フール)」のイギーと「ゲブ神」のンドゥール その2)	Toshiyuki Katō	Taisuke Mamori, Toshiyuki Katō	Yasuko Kobayashi	January 17, 2015	February 25, 2018
53	27	"Khnum's Oingo and Thoth's Boingo / Khnum's Zenyatta and Thoth's Mondatta"; Transliteration: "'Kunumu-shin' no Oingo to 'Toto-shin' no Boingo" (Japanese: 「クヌム神」のオインゴと「トト神」のボインゴ)	Naokatsu Tsuda	Hitomi Ezoe	Kazuyuki Fudeyasu	January 24, 2015	March 4, 2018
54	28	"Anubis, Part 1"; Transliteration: "'Anubisu-shin' Sono 1" (Japanese: 「アヌビス神」 その1)	Jirō Fujimoto	Jirō Fujimoto	Shin'ichi Inotsume	January 31, 2015	March 11, 2018
55	29	"Anubis, Part 2"; Transliteration: "'Anubisu-shin' Sono 2" (Japanese: 「アヌビス神」 その2)	Toshiyuki Katō	Toshiyuki Katō	Shin'ichi Inotsume	February 7, 2015	March 18, 2018
56	30	"Bastet's Mariah, Part 1"; Transliteration: "'Basuteto-joshin' no Maraia Sono 1" (Japanese: 「バステト女神」のマライア その1)	Shin'ya Kawatsura	Shigatsu Yoshikawa	Shōgo Yasukawa	February 14, 2015	March 25, 2018
57	31	"Bastet's Mariah, Part 2"; Transliteration: "'Basuteto-joshin' no Maraia Sono 2" (Japanese: 「バステト女神」のマライア その2)	Taizō Yoshida	Yūta Takamura	Shōgo Yasukawa	February 21, 2015	April 8, 2018 (Note: Also aired in Japanese on April 1, 2018 as part of Adult Swim's April Fools prank)
58	32	"Set's Alessi, Part 1"; Transliteration: "'Seto-shin' no Aresshī Sono 1" (Japanese: 「セト神」のアレッシー その1)	Taizō Yoshida	Kentarō Fujita	Kazuyuki Fudeyasu	February 28, 2015	April 15, 2018
59	33	"Set's Alessi, Part 2"; Transliteration: "'Seto-shin' no Aresshī Sono 2" (Japanese: 「セト神」のアレッシー その2)	Yasufumi Soejima	Yasufumi Soejima	Kazuyuki Fudeyasu	March 7, 2015	April 22, 2018
60	34	"D'Arby the Gambler, Part 1"; Transliteration: "Dābī Za Gyanburā Sono 1" (Japanese: ダービー・ザ・ギャンブラー その1)	Naokatsu Tsuda	Yūta Takamura	Shōgo Yasukawa	March 14, 2015	April 29, 2018
61	35	"D'Arby the Gambler, Part 2"; Transliteration: "Dābī Za Gyanburā Sono 2" (Japanese: ダービー・ザ・ギャンブラー その2)	Naokatsu Tsuda, Hitomi Ezoe	Hitomi Ezoe	Shōgo Yasukawa	March 21, 2015	May 6, 2018
62	36	"Hol Horse and Boingo, Part 1 / Hol Horse and Mondatta, Part 1"; Transliteration: "Horu Hōsu to Boingo Sono 1" (Japanese: ホル・ホースとボインゴ その1)	Masayoshi Nishida	Shunsuke Machitani	Yasuko Kobayashi	March 28, 2015	May 13, 2018
63	37	"Hol Horse and Boingo, Part 2 / Hol Horse and Mondatta, Part 2"; Transliteration: "Horu Hōsu to Boingo Sono 2" (Japanese: ホル・ホースとボインゴ その2)	Taizō Yoshida	Taisuke Mamori	Yasuko Kobayashi	April 4, 2015	May 20, 2018
64	38	"The Guardian of Hell, Pet Shop, Part 1"; Transliteration: "Jigoku no Monban Petto Shoppu Sono 1" (Japanese: 地獄の門番ペット·ショップ その1)	Ken'ichi Suzuki	Shigatsu Yoshikawa	Ken'ichi Suzuki	April 11, 2015	June 3, 2018
65	39	"The Guardian of Hell, Pet Shop, Part 2"; Transliteration: "Jigoku no Monban Petto Shoppu Sono 2" (Japanese: 地獄の門番ペット·ショップ その2)	Ken'ichi Suzuki	Jirō Fujimoto	Ken'ichi Suzuki	April 18, 2015	June 10, 2018
66	40	"D'Arby the Player, Part 1"; Transliteration: "Dābī za Pureiyā Sono 1" (Japanese: ダービー・ザ・プレイヤー その1)	Yasufumi Soejima	Yasufumi Soejima	Kazuyuki Fudeyasu	April 25, 2015	June 17, 2018
67	41	"D'Arby the Player, Part 2"; Transliteration: "Dābī za Pureiyā Sono 2" (Japanese: ダービー・ザ・プレイヤー その2)	Jin Tamamura	Taisuke Mamori	Kazuyuki Fudeyasu	May 2, 2015	June 24, 2018
68	42	"The Miasma of the Void, Vanilla Ice, Part 1 / The Miasma of the Void, Cool Ice, Part 1"; Transliteration: "Akū no Shōki Vanira Aisu Sono 1" (Japanese: 亜空の瘴気 ヴァニラ・アイス その1)	Shunsuke Machitani	Shunsuke Machitani, Eri Nagata	Shin'ichi Inotsume	May 9, 2015	July 1, 2018
69	43	"The Miasma of the Void, Vanilla Ice, Part 2 / The Miasma of the Void, Cool Ice, Part 2"; Transliteration: "Akū no Shōki Vanira Aisu Sono 2" (Japanese: 亜空の瘴気 ヴァニラ・アイス その2)	Toshiyuki Katō	Yūta Takamura	Shin'ichi Inotsume	May 16, 2015	July 8, 2018
70	44	"The Miasma of the Void, Vanilla Ice, Part 3 / The Miasma of the Void, Cool Ice, Part 3"; Transliteration: "Akū no Shōki Vanira Aisu Sono 3" (Japanese: 亜空の瘴気 ヴァニラ・アイス その3)	Taizō Yoshida	Hitomi Ezoe	Shin'ichi Inotsume	May 23, 2015	July 15, 2018
71	45	"Dio's World, Part 1"; Transliteration: "Dio no Sekai Sono 1" (Japanese: Dioの世界 その1)	Masayoshi Nishida	Shigatsu Yoshikawa	Shōgo Yasukawa	May 30, 2015	July 22, 2018
72	46	"Dio's World, Part 2"; Transliteration: "Dio no Sekai Sono 2" (Japanese: Dioの世界 その2)	Toshiyuki Katō	Toshiyuki Katō	Shōgo Yasukawa	June 6, 2015	July 29, 2018
73	47	"Dio's World, Part 3"; Transliteration: "Dio no Sekai Sono 3" (Japanese: Dioの世界 その3)	Naokatsu Tsuda	Taisuke Mamori, Yūta Takamura, Yasufumi Soejima	Yasuko Kobayashi	June 13, 2015	August 5, 2018
74	48	"Long Journey Farewell, My Friends"; Transliteration: "Harukanaru Tabiji Saraba Tomo yo" (Japanese: 遥かなる旅路 さらば友よ)	Ken'ichi Suzuki, Toshiyuki Katō	Shigatsu Yoshikawa, Shunsuke Machitani, Toshiyuki Katō	Yasuko Kobayashi	June 20, 2015	August 12, 2018

=== Season 3: Diamond Is Unbreakable (2016) ===
No. overall	No. in season	Title	Storyboarded by	Directed by	Written by	Original release date	English air date
75	1	"Jotaro Kujo! Meets Josuke Higashikata"; Transliteration: "Kūjō Jōtarō! Higashikata Jōsuke ni Au" (Japanese: 空条承太郎！ 東方仗助に会う)	Naokatsu Tsuda	Yūta Takamura	Yasuko Kobayashi	April 2, 2016	August 19, 2018
76	2	"Josuke Higashikata! Meets Angelo"; Transliteration: "Higashikata Jōsuke! Anjero ni Au" (Japanese: 東方仗助！ アンジェロに会う)	Toshiyuki Katō	Toshiyuki Katō	Yasuko Kobayashi	April 9, 2016	August 26, 2018
77	3	"The Nijimura Brothers, Part 1"; Transliteration: "Nijimura Kyōdai, Sono 1" (Japanese: 虹村兄弟 その1)	Takahiko Yoshida	Takahiko Yoshida	Yasuko Kobayashi	April 16, 2016	September 9, 2018
78	4	"The Nijimura Brothers, Part 2"; Transliteration: "Nijimura Kyōdai, Sono 2" (Japanese: 虹村兄弟 その2)	Yūta Takamura	Yasufumi Soejima, Toshiyuki Katō, Naokatsu Tsuda, Yūta Takamura	Shōgo Yasukawa	April 23, 2016	September 16, 2018
79	5	"The Nijimura Brothers, Part 3"; Transliteration: "Nijimura Kyōdai, Sono 3" (Japanese: 虹村兄弟 その3)	Toshiyuki Katō	Yukihiko Asaki	Shōgo Yasukawa	April 30, 2016	September 23, 2018
80	6	"Koichi Hirose (Echoes) / Koichi Hirose (Reverb)"; Transliteration: "Hirose Koichi (Ekōzu)" (Japanese: 広瀬康一 (エコーズ))	Yasufumi Soejima	Yasufumi Soejima	Kazuyuki Fudeyasu	May 7, 2016	September 30, 2018
81	7	"Toshikazu Hazamada (Surface) / Toshikazu Hazamada (Show Off)"; Transliteration: "Hazamada Toshikazu (Sāfisu)" (Japanese: 間田敏和 (サーフィス))	Satoshi Ōsedo	Hitomi Ezoe	Shin'ichi Inotsume	May 14, 2016	October 7, 2018
82	8	"Yukako Yamagishi Falls in Love, Part 1"; Transliteration: "Yamagishi Yukako wa Koi o Suru, Sono 1" (Japanese: 山岸由花子は恋をする その1)	Jirō Fujimoto	Jirō Fujimoto	Shōgo Yasukawa	May 21, 2016	October 14, 2018
83	9	"Yukako Yamagishi Falls in Love, Part 2"; Transliteration: "Yamagishi Yukako wa Koi o Suru, Sono 2" (Japanese: 山岸由花子は恋をする その2)	Toshiyuki Katō	Kim Min-sun	Shōgo Yasukawa	May 28, 2016	October 21, 2018
84	10	"Let's Go Eat Some Italian Food"; Transliteration: "Itaria Ryōri o Tabe ni Ikō" (Japanese: イタリア料理を食べに行こう)	Fumiaki Kōta	Fumiaki Kōta, Hikaru Murata	Kazuyuki Fudeyasu	June 4, 2016	October 28, 2018
85	11	"Red Hot Chili Pepper, Part 1 / Chili Pepper, Part 1"; Transliteration: "Reddo Hotto Chiri Peppā, Sono 1" (Japanese: レッド・ホット・チリ・ペッパー その1)	Susumu Nishizawa	Eum Sang-yong	Yasuko Kobayashi	June 11, 2016	November 4, 2018
86	12	"Red Hot Chili Pepper, Part 2 / Chili Pepper, Part 2"; Transliteration: "Reddo Hotto Chiri Peppā, Sono 2" (Japanese: レッド・ホット・チリ・ペッパー その2)	Toshiyuki Katō	Yukihiko Asaki	Yasuko Kobayashi	June 18, 2016	November 11, 2018
87	13	"We Picked Up Something Crazy!"; Transliteration: "Yabaimono o Hirottassu!" (Japanese: やばいものを拾ったっス！)	Taizō Yoshida	Jirō Fujimoto	Shin'ichi Inotsume	June 25, 2016	November 25, 2018
88	14	"Let's Go to the Manga Artist's House, Part 1"; Transliteration: "Mangaka no Uchi e Asobi ni Ikō, Sono 1" (Japanese: 漫画家のうちへ遊びに行こう その1)	Naokatsu Tsuda	Naokatsu Tsuda, Yasufumi Soejima, Toshiyuki Katō, Yukihiko Asaki	Yasuko Kobayashi	July 2, 2016	December 2, 2018
89	15	"Let's Go to the Manga Artist's House, Part 2"; Transliteration: "Mangaka no Uchi e Asobi ni Ikō, Sono 2" (Japanese: 漫画家のうちへ遊びに行こう その2)	Yasufumi Soejima	Tadahito Matsubayashi	Yasuko Kobayashi	July 9, 2016	December 9, 2018
90	16	"Let's Go Hunting!"; Transliteration: "Hantingu ni Ikō!" (Japanese: 狩り(ハンティング)に行こう！)	Yoriyasu Kogawa	Yoriyasu Kogawa	Shōgo Yasukawa	July 16, 2016	December 16, 2018
91	17	"Rohan Kishibe's Adventure"; Transliteration: "Kishibe Rohan no Bōken" (Japanese: 岸辺露伴の冒険)	Sōichi Shimada	Sōichi Shimada	Shin'ichi Inotsume	July 23, 2016	January 6, 2019
92	18	"Shigechi's Harvest, Part 1"; Transliteration: "Shigechī no Hāvesuto, Sono 1" (Japanese: ｢重ちー｣の収穫(ハーヴェスト) その1)	Eri Nagata	Eri Nagata	Kazuyuki Fudeyasu	July 30, 2016	January 13, 2019
93	19	"Shigechi's Harvest, Part 2"; Transliteration: "Shigechī no Hāvesuto, Sono 2" (Japanese: ｢重ちー｣の収穫(ハーヴェスト) その2)	Shinpei Nagai	Masami Hata, Kim Min-sun	Kazuyuki Fudeyasu	August 6, 2016	January 20, 2019
94	20	"Yukako Yamagishi Dreams of Cinderella"; Transliteration: "Yamagishi Yukako wa Shinderera ni Akogareru" (Japanese: 山岸由花子はシンデレラに憧れる)	Jirō Fujimoto, Naokatsu Tsuda	Jirō Fujimoto	Shōgo Yasukawa	August 13, 2016	January 27, 2019
95	21	"Yoshikage Kira Just Wants to Live Quietly, Part 1"; Transliteration: "Kira Yoshikage wa Shizuka ni Kurashitai, Sono 1" (Japanese: 吉良吉影は静かに暮らしたい その1)	Yoriyasu Kogawa	Eum Sang-yong	Yasuko Kobayashi	August 20, 2016	February 3, 2019
96	22	"Yoshikage Kira Just Wants to Live Quietly, Part 2"; Transliteration: "Kira Yoshikage wa Shizuka ni Kurashitai, Sono 2" (Japanese: 吉良吉影は静かに暮らしたい その2)	Toshiyuki Katō	Hitomi Ezoe	Yasuko Kobayashi	August 27, 2016	February 10, 2019
97	23	"Sheer Heart Attack, Part 1 / Heart Attack, Part 1"; Transliteration: "Shiā Hāto Atakku, Sono 1" (Japanese: シアーハートアタック その1)	Sōichi Shimada	Hikaru Murata	Shōgo Yasukawa	September 3, 2016	February 17, 2019
98	24	"Sheer Heart Attack, Part 2 / Heart Attack, Part 2"; Transliteration: "Shiā Hāto Atakku, Sono 2" (Japanese: シアーハートアタック その2)	Sōichi Shimada	Yasufumi Soejima	Shōgo Yasukawa	September 10, 2016	February 24, 2019
99	25	"Atom Heart Father / Heart Father"; Transliteration: "Atomu Hāto Fāzā" (Japanese: アトム・ハート・ファーザー)	Eri Nagata	Eri Nagata	Shin'ichi Inotsume	September 17, 2016	March 3, 2019
100	26	"Janken Boy Is Coming!"; Transliteration: "Janken Kozō ga Yatte Kuru!" (Japanese: ジャンケン小僧がやって来る！)	Yasufumi Soejima	Kim Min-sun	Kazuyuki Fudeyasu	September 24, 2016	March 10, 2019
101	27	"I'm an Alien"; Transliteration: "Boku wa Uchūjin" (Japanese: ぼくは宇宙人)	Naokatsu Tsuda	Naokatsu Tsuda, Yukihiko Asaki	Kazuyuki Fudeyasu	October 1, 2016	March 17, 2019
102	28	"Highway Star, Part 1 / Highway Go Go, Part 1"; Transliteration: "Haiwei Sutā Sono 1" (Japanese: ハイウェイ・スター その1)	Jin Tamamura	Jin Tamamura	Kazuyuki Fudeyasu	October 8, 2016	March 24, 2019
103	29	"Highway Star, Part 2 / Highway Go Go, Part 2"; Transliteration: "Haiwei Sutā Sono 2" (Japanese: ハイウェイ・スター その2)	Yoriyasu Kogawa	Hikaru Murata	Kazuyuki Fudeyasu	October 15, 2016	March 31, 2019
104	30	"Cats Love Yoshikage Kira"; Transliteration: "Neko wa Kira Yoshikage ga Suki" (Japanese: 猫は吉良吉影が好き)	Sōichi Shimada	Jun Fujiwara, Yasufumi Soejima, Hitomi Ezoe, Tokihiro Sasaki, Yukihiko Asaki, Keisuke Nishijima	Shin'ichi Inotsume, Kazuyuki Fudeyasu	October 22, 2016	April 7, 2019
105	31	"July 15th (Thursday), Part 1"; Transliteration: "Shigatsu Jūgo-nichi (Moku), Sono 1" (Japanese: 7月15日(木) その1)	Eri Nagata, Yasufumi Soejima, Taizō Yoshida	Eri Nagata, Yasufumi Soejima, Naokatsu Tsuda	Yasuko Kobayashi	October 29, 2016	April 14, 2019
106	32	"July 15th (Thursday), Part 2"; Transliteration: "Shigatsu Jūgo-nichi (Moku), Sono 2" (Japanese: 7月15日(木) その2)	Eri Nagata, Yasufumi Soejima, Taizō Yoshida	Eri Nagata, Yasufumi Soejima, Naokatsu Tsuda	Yasuko Kobayashi	November 5, 2016	April 21, 2019
107	33	"July 15th (Thursday), Part 3"; Transliteration: "Shigatsu Jūgo-nichi (Moku), Sono 3" (Japanese: 7月15日(木) その3)	Yasufumi Soejima, Taizō Yoshida	Yasufumi Soejima, Jirō Fujimoto, Hitomi Ezoe	Yasuko Kobayashi	November 12, 2016	April 28, 2019
108	34	"July 15th (Thursday), Part 4"; Transliteration: "Shigatsu Jūgo-nichi (Moku), Sono 4" (Japanese: 7月15日(木) その4)	Taizō Yoshida	Jirō Fujimoto, Hitomi Ezoe	Yasuko Kobayashi	November 19, 2016	May 5, 2019
109	35	"Another One Bites the Dust, Part 1 / Bites the Dust, Part 1"; Transliteration: "Anazāwan Baitsa Dasuto, Sono 1" (Japanese: アナザーワン バイツァ・ダスト その1)	Toshiyuki Katō	Toshiyuki Katō, Hikaru Murata	Shōgo Yasukawa	November 26, 2016	May 12, 2019
110	36	"Another One Bites the Dust, Part 2 / Bites the Dust, Part 2"; Transliteration: "Anazāwan Baitsa Dasuto, Sono 2" (Japanese: アナザーワン バイツァ・ダスト その2)	Toshiyuki Katō, Naokatsu Tsuda	Yasuo Ejima, Keisuke Nishijima	Shōgo Yasukawa	December 3, 2016	May 19, 2019
111	37	"Crazy D (Diamond) is Unbreakable, Part 1 / Shining D (Diamond) is Unbreakable, Part 1"; Transliteration: "Kureijī Daiyamondo wa Kudakenai, Sono 1" (Japanese: クレイジー・D(ダイヤモンド)は砕けない その1)	Yoriyasu Kogawa	Yasufumi Soejima, Eri Nagata	Kazuyuki Fudeyasu	December 10, 2016	May 26, 2019
112	38	"Crazy D (Diamond) is Unbreakable, Part 2 / Shining D (Diamond) is Unbreakable, Part 2"; Transliteration: "Kureijī Daiyamondo wa Kudakenai, Sono 2" (Japanese: クレイジー・D(ダイヤモンド)は砕けない その2)	Fumitoshi Oizaki	Toshiyuki Katō, Hikaru Murata, Naokatsu Tsuda	Kazuyuki Fudeyasu	December 17, 2016	June 2, 2019
113	39	"Goodbye, Morioh - The Heart of Gold"; Transliteration: "Sayonara Moriō-chō - Ōgon no Kokoro" (Japanese: さよなら杜王町ー黄金の心)	Naokatsu Tsuda	Naokatsu Tsuda	Yasuko Kobayashi	December 24, 2016	June 9, 2019

=== Season 4: Golden Wind (2018–2019) ===
No. overall	No. in season	Title	Storyboarded by	Directed by	Written by	Original release date (Note: Tokyo MX lists the series as premiering at 25:05 on Friday, which is effectively Saturday at 1:05 a.m. JST.)	English air date
114	1	"Gold Experience / Golden Wind"; Transliteration: "Gōrudo Ekusuperiensu" (Japanese: 黄金体験(ゴールド・エクスペリエンス))	Naokatsu Tsuda	Naokatsu Tsuda	Yasuko Kobayashi	July 5, 2018 (festival debut); October 6, 2018	October 27, 2019
115	2	"Bucciarati Is Coming / Bucciarati Appears"; Transliteration: "Bucharati ga Kuru" (Japanese: ブチャラティが来る)	Hideya Takahashi	Hideya Takahashi	Yasuko Kobayashi	September 25, 2018 (Lumine debut); October 13, 2018	November 3, 2019
116	3	"Meet the Gangster Behind the Wall / Meet the Mafioso Behind the Wall"; Transliteration: "Hei no Naka no Gyangu ni Ae" (Japanese: 塀の中のギャングに会え)	Yasuhiro Kimura	Yasuhiro Kimura	Shōgo Yasukawa	October 20, 2018	November 10, 2019
117	4	"Joining the Gang / Joining the Famiglia"; Transliteration: "Gyangu Nyūmon" (Japanese: ギャング入門)	Yasuhiro Kimura	Kyōhei Suzuki	Shōgo Yasukawa	October 27, 2018	November 17, 2019
118	5	"Find Polpo's Fortune! / Let's Find Polpo's Fortune!"; Transliteration: "Porupo no Isan o Nerae!" (Japanese: ポルポの遺産を狙え！)	Naokatsu Tsuda	Takahiro Kamei	Yasuko Kobayashi	November 3, 2018	November 24, 2019
119	6	"Moody Blues' Counterattack / Moody Jazz's Counterattack"; Transliteration: "Mūdī Burūsu no Gyakushū" (Japanese: ムーディー・ブルースの逆襲)	Hideya Takahashi	Yoshiko Mikami	Kazuyuki Fudeyasu	November 10, 2018	December 8, 2019
120	7	"Sex Pistols Appears, Part 1 / Six Bullets Appears, Part 1"; Transliteration: "Sekkusu Pisutoruzu Tōjō Sono Ichi" (Japanese: セックス・ピストルズ登場 その①)	Kyōhei Suzuki	Kyōhei Suzuki	Kazuyuki Fudeyasu	November 17, 2018	December 15, 2019
121	8	"Sex Pistols Appears, Part 2 / Six Bullets Appears, Part 2"; Transliteration: "Sekkusu Pisutoruzu Tōjō Sono Ni" (Japanese: セックス・ピストルズ登場 その②)	Masako One	Shinji Osada	Kazuyuki Fudeyasu	November 24, 2018	January 5, 2020
122	9	"The First Mission from the Boss"; Transliteration: "Bosu Kara no Dai-ichi Shirei" (Japanese: ボスからの第一指令)	Tatsuma Minamikawa	Tatsuma Minamikawa	Shin'ichi Inotsume	December 1, 2018	January 12, 2020
123	10	"Hitman Team"; Transliteration: "Hittoman Chīmu" (Japanese: 暗殺者（ヒットマン）チーム)	Jirō Fujimoto	Jirō Fujimoto	Shin'ichi Inotsume	December 8, 2018	January 19, 2020
124	11	"Narancia's Aerosmith / Narancia's Li'l Bomber"; Transliteration: "Narancha no Earosumisu" (Japanese: ナランチャのエアロスミス)	Yoshiko Mikami, Hideya Takahashi	Shinji Osada	Shin'ichi Inotsume	December 15, 2018	January 26, 2020
125	12	"The Second Mission from the Boss"; Transliteration: "Bosu Kara no Daini Shirei" (Japanese: ボスからの第二指令)	Taizō Yoshida	Takahiro Kamei	Shōgo Yasukawa	December 22, 2018	February 2, 2020
126	13	"Man in the Mirror and Purple Haze / Mirror Man and Purple Smoke"; Transliteration: "Man in za Mirā to Pāpuru Heizu" (Japanese: マン・イン・ザ・ミラーとパープル・ヘイズ)	Taizō Yoshida	Yasuo Ejima	Shōgo Yasukawa	December 29, 2018	February 9, 2020
127	14	"Express Train to Florence / Il Treno Espresso per Firenze"; Transliteration: "Firentse Iki Chōtokkyū" (Japanese: フィレンツェ行き超特急)	Takashi Kawabata	Kyōhei Suzuki	Kazuyuki Fudeyasu	January 12, 2019	February 16, 2020
128	15	"The Grateful Dead, Part 1 / Thankful Death, Part 1"; Transliteration: "Za Gureitofuru Deddo Sono Ichi" (Japanese: 偉大なる死(ザ・グレイトフル・デッド) その①)	Tatsuma Minamikawa	Tatsuma Minamikawa	Kazuyuki Fudeyasu	January 19, 2019	February 23, 2020
129	16	"The Grateful Dead, Part 2 / Thankful Death, Part 2"; Transliteration: "Za Gureitofuru Deddo Sono Ni" (Japanese: 偉大なる死(ザ・グレイトフル・デッド) その②)	Hiromasa Seki	Ken Takahashi	Yasuko Kobayashi	January 26, 2019	March 1, 2020
130	17	"Baby Face / Babyhead"; Transliteration: "Beibī Feisu" (Japanese: ベイビィ・フェイス)	Takashi Kawabata, Naokatsu Tsuda	Naokatsu Tsuda, Masakazu Takahashi	Yasuko Kobayashi	February 2, 2019	March 8, 2020
131	18	"Head to Venice! / Verso Venezia"; Transliteration: "Venetsia e Mukae!" (Japanese: ヴェネツィアへ向かえ!)	Yō Nakano, Hideya Takahashi	Yoshihiro Miyajima	Shin'ichi Inotsume	February 9, 2019	March 15, 2020
132	19	"White Album / White Ice"; Transliteration: "Howaito Arubamu" (Japanese: ホワイト・アルバム)	Taizō Yoshida	Shinji Osada	Shin'ichi Inotsume	February 16, 2019	March 22, 2020
133	20	"The Final Mission from the Boss"; Transliteration: "Bosu Kara no Saishū Shirei" (Japanese: ボスからの最終指令)	Takahiro Kamei	Takahiro Kamei	Naokatsu Tsuda	February 23, 2019	March 29, 2020
134	21	"The Mystery of King Crimson / The Mystery of Emperor Crimson"; Transliteration: "Kingu Kurimuzon no Nazo" (Japanese: キング・クリムゾンの謎)	Naokatsu Tsuda, Yasuhiro Kimura	Naokatsu Tsuda, Masakazu Takahashi	Naokatsu Tsuda	March 2, 2019	April 5, 2020
135	22	"The 'G' in Guts / The 'G' in Gozzo"; Transliteration: "Gattsu no Jī" (Japanese: ガッツの「G」)	Hideya Takahashi, Jirō Fujimoto	Hikaru Murata	Shōgo Yasukawa	March 16, 2019	April 19, 2020
136	23	"Clash and Talking Head / Crush and Talking Mouth"; Transliteration: "Kurasshu to Tōkingu Heddo" (Japanese: クラッシュとトーキング・ヘッド)	Jirō Fujimoto	Hitomi Ezoe	Shōgo Yasukawa	March 23, 2019	April 26, 2020
137	24	"Notorious B.I.G / Notorious Chase"; Transliteration: "Notōriasu Biggu" (Japanese: ノトーリアス・B・I・G(ビッグ))	Takashi Kawabata	Kyōhei Suzuki	Kazuyuki Fudeyasu	March 30, 2019	May 3, 2020
138	25	"Spice Girl / Spicy Lady"; Transliteration: "Supaisu Gāru" (Japanese: スパイス・ガール)	Tatsuma Minamikawa, Jirō Fujimoto	Masakazu Takahashi	Kazuyuki Fudeyasu	April 6, 2019	May 10, 2020
139	26	"A Little Story From The Past ~My Name Is Doppio~"; Transliteration: "Honno Sukoshi Mukashi no Monogatari ~Boku no Na wa Doppio~" (Japanese: ほんの少し昔の物語 ~ぼくの名はドッピオ~)	Takahiro Kamei	Takahiro Kamei, Hikaru Murata, Hironori Aoyagi	Shin'ichi Inotsume	April 13, 2019	May 17, 2020
140	27	"King Crimson vs. Metallica / Emperor Crimson vs. Metallic"; Transliteration: "Kingu Kurimuzon vs. Metarika" (Japanese: キング・クリムゾン vs. メタリカ)	Taizō Yoshida	Shinji Osada	Akira Horiuchi	April 20, 2019	May 24, 2020
141	28	"Beneath a Sky on the Verge of Falling"; Transliteration: "Ima ni mo Ochite Kisō na Sora no Shita de" (Japanese: 今にも落ちて来そうな空の下で)	Hideya Takahashi	Hideya Takahashi	Yasuko Kobayashi	April 27, 2019	May 31, 2020
142	29	"Get to the Roman Colosseum! / Verso il Colosseo di Roma"; Transliteration: "Mokutekichi wa Rōma! Korosseo" (Japanese: 目的地はローマ！コロッセオ)	Yūsuke Kubo	Yūsuke Kubo	Shōgo Yasukawa	May 11, 2019	August 2, 2020
143	30	"Green Day and Oasis, Part 1 / Green Tea and Sanctuary, Part 1"; Transliteration: "Gurīn Dei to Oashisu Sono Ichi" (Japanese: グリーン・ディとオアシス その①)	Takashi Kawabata	Yōji Satō	Shōgo Yasukawa	May 18, 2019	August 9, 2020
144	31	"Green Day and Oasis, Part 2 / Green Tea and Sanctuary, Part 2"; Transliteration: "Gurīn Dei to Oashisu Sono Ni" (Japanese: グリーン・ディとオアシス その②)	Jirō Fujimoto	Yasuhiro Kimura	Kazuyuki Fudeyasu	May 25, 2019	August 30, 2020
145	32	"Green Day and Oasis, Part 3 / Green Tea and Sanctuary, Part 3"; Transliteration: "Gurīn Dei to Oashisu Sono San" (Japanese: グリーン・ディとオアシス その③)	Minoru Ōhara	Shinji Osada	Kazuyuki Fudeyasu	June 1, 2019	September 6, 2020
146	33	"His Name Is Diavolo"; Transliteration: "Soitsu no Na wa Diaboro" (Japanese: そいつの名はディアボロ)	Minoru Ōhara	Hironori Aoyagi, Keiichi Matsuki	Akira Horiuchi	June 8, 2019	September 13, 2020
147	34	"The Requiem Quietly Plays, Part 1"; Transliteration: "Rekuiemu wa Shizuka ni Kanaderareru Sono Ichi" (Japanese: 鎮魂歌(レクイエム)は静かに奏でられる その①)	Minoru Ōhara	Norihito Takahashi	Shōgo Yasukawa	June 15, 2019	September 20, 2020
148	35	"The Requiem Quietly Plays, Part 2"; Transliteration: "Rekuiemu wa Shizuka ni Kanaderareru Sono Ni" (Japanese: 鎮魂歌(レクイエム)は静かに奏でられる その②)	Yūsuke Kubo	Yūsuke Kubo	Shin'ichi Inotsume	June 22, 2019	September 27, 2020
149	36	"Diavolo Surfaces"; Transliteration: "Diaboro Fujō" (Japanese: ディアボロ浮上)	Taizō Yoshida	Takahiro Kamei	Shin'ichi Inotsume	June 29, 2019	October 4, 2020
150	37	"King of Kings"; Transliteration: "Kingu Obu Kingusu" (Japanese: 王の中の王(キング・オブ・キングス))	Kyōhei Suzuki, Minoru Ōhara	Kyōhei Suzuki	Kazuyuki Fudeyasu	July 6, 2019	October 11, 2020
151	38	"Gold Experience Requiem / Golden Wind Requiem"; Transliteration: "Gōrudo Ekusuperiensu Rekuiemu" (Japanese: ゴールド・E(エクスペリエンス)・レクイエム)	Toshiyuki Katō, Jirō Fujimoto	Shō Sugawara	Yasuko Kobayashi	July 28, 2019	October 18, 2020
152	39	"The Sleeping Slave"; Transliteration: "Nemureru Dorei" (Japanese: 眠れる奴隷)	Jirō Fujimoto, Taizō Yoshida	Yasutoshi Iwasaki, Hideya Takahashi	Yasuko Kobayashi	July 28, 2019	October 25, 2020

=== Season 5: Stone Ocean (2021–2022) ===
No. overall	No. in season	Title (Note: English episode titles are taken from Netflix. In instances where names are altered from the Japanese version, the original Japanese translation is used on the left while the edited Netflix title is used on the right.)	Storyboarded by	Directed by	Written by	Original release date	Japanese air date
153	1	"Stone Ocean"; Transliteration: "Sutōn Ōshan" (Japanese: 石作りの海(ストーンオーシャン))	Ken'ichi Suzuki	Toshiyuki Katō	Yasuko Kobayashi	December 1, 2021	January 8, 2022
154	2	"Stone Free / Prisoner FE40536: Jolyne Cujoh"; Transliteration: "Sutōn Furī" (Japanese: ストーン・フリー)	Toshiyuki Katō	Daisuke Chiba	Yasuko Kobayashi	December 1, 2021	January 15, 2022
155	3	"The Visitor (1)"; Transliteration: "Menkainin Sono Ichi" (Japanese: 面会人 その①)	Taizō Yoshida	Kunihiro Mori	Yasuko Kobayashi	December 1, 2021	January 22, 2022
156	4	"The Visitor (2)"; Transliteration: "Menkainin Sono Ni" (Japanese: 面会人 その②)	Taizō Yoshida	Tetsuji Nakamura	Yasuko Kobayashi	December 1, 2021	January 29, 2022
157	5	"Prisoner of Love"; Transliteration: "Purizunā obu Ravu" (Japanese: プリズナー・オブ・ラヴ)	Katsuichi Nakayama	Katsuichi Nakayama	Yasuko Kobayashi	December 1, 2021	February 5, 2022
158	6	"Ermes's Stickers"; Transliteration: "Erumesu no Shīru" (Japanese: エルメェスのシール)	Tatsuma Minamikawa	Tatsuma Minamikawa	Shin'ichi Inotsume	December 1, 2021	February 12, 2022
159	7	"There's Six of Us!"; Transliteration: "Roku-nin Iru!" (Japanese: 6人いる！)	Jirō Fujimoto, Toshiyuki Katō	Masakazu Takahashi	Shōgo Yasukawa	December 1, 2021	February 19, 2022
160	8	"Foo Fighters / F.F."; Transliteration: "Fū Faitāzu" (Japanese: フー・ファイターズ)	Katsumi Terahigashi	Eiichi Kuboyama	Shōgo Yasukawa	December 1, 2021	February 26, 2022
161	9	"Debt Collector Marilyn Manson / Debt Collector Mary Lynn Manson"; Transliteration: "Toritatenin Maririn Manson" (Japanese: 取り立て人マリリン・マンソン)	Satoshi Ōsedo	Satoshi Ōsedo	Kazuyuki Fudeyasu, Yasuko Kobayashi	December 1, 2021	March 5, 2022
162	10	"Operation Savage Garden (Head to the Courtyard!) (1) / Operation Savage Guardian (Head to the Courtyard!) (1)"; Transliteration: "Saveji Gāden Sakusen (Nakaniwa e Mukae!) Sono Ichi" (Japanese: サヴェジ・ガーデン作戦（中庭へ向かえ！）その①)	Tatsuma Minamikawa	Tatsuma Minamikawa	Shin'ichi Inotsume	December 1, 2021	March 12, 2022
163	11	"Operation Savage Garden (Head to the Courtyard!) (2) / Operation Savage Guardian (Head to the Courtyard!) (2)"; Transliteration: "Saveji Gāden Sakusen (Nakaniwa e Mukae!) Sono Ni" (Japanese: サヴェジ・ガーデン作戦（中庭へ向かえ！）その②)	Yūsuke Kubo	Katsuichi Nakayama	Kazuyuki Fudeyasu	December 1, 2021	March 19, 2022
164	12	"Torrential Downpour Warning"; Transliteration: "Shūchū Gōu Keihō Hatsurei" (Japanese: 集中豪雨警報発令)	Taizō Yoshida	Hikaru Murata, Toshiyuki Katō	Shōgo Yasukawa	December 1, 2021	March 26, 2022
165	13	"Kiss of Love and Revenge (1) / Smack of Love and Revenge (1)"; Transliteration: "Ai to Fukushū no Kissu Sono Ichi" (Japanese: 愛と復讐のキッス その①)	Toshiyuki Katō	Daishi Katō	Shin'ichi Inotsume	September 1, 2022	October 8, 2022
166	14	"Kiss of Love and Revenge (2) / Smack of Love and Revenge (2)"; Transliteration: "Ai to Fukushū no Kissu Sono Ni" (Japanese: 愛と復讐のキッス その②)	Taizō Yoshida	Shingo Tanabe	Shin'ichi Inotsume	September 1, 2022	October 15, 2022
167	15	"Ultra Security House Unit"; Transliteration: "Urutora Sekyuriti Chōbatsubō" (Japanese: ウルトラセキュリティ懲罰房)	Jirō Fujimoto, Mamoru Kurosawa	Shō Sugawara	Kazuyuki Fudeyasu	September 1, 2022	October 22, 2022
168	16	"The Secret of Guard Westwood"; Transliteration: "Kanshu Uesutouddo no Himitsu" (Japanese: 看守ウエストウッドの秘密)	Katsuichi Nakayama, Toshiyuki Katō	Katsuichi Nakayama	Kazuyuki Fudeyasu	September 1, 2022	October 29, 2022
169	17	"Enter the Dragon's Dream / Enter the Drake's Dream"; Transliteration: "Moe yo Doragonzu Dorīmu" (Japanese: 燃えよ龍の夢(ドラゴンズ・ドリーム))	Eiichi Kuboyama, Mamoru Kurosawa	Eiichi Kuboyama	Shōgo Yasukawa	September 1, 2022	November 5, 2022
170	18	"Enter the Foo Fighters / Enter the F.F."; Transliteration: "Moe yo Fū Faitāzu" (Japanese: 燃えよフー・ファイターズ)	Taizō Yoshida	Tadako Nagai	Shōgo Yasukawa	September 1, 2022	November 12, 2022
171	19	"Birth of the 'Green'"; Transliteration: "'Midoriiro' no Tanjō" (Japanese: ｢緑色｣の誕生)	Tatsuma Minamikawa	Masakazu Takahashi	Shōgo Yasukawa	September 1, 2022	November 19, 2022
172	20	"F.F. – The Witness"; Transliteration: "Efu Efu – Mokugekisha" (Japanese: F・F－目撃者)	Kōji Hōri	Naoko Takeichi	Kazuyuki Fudeyasu	September 1, 2022	November 26, 2022
173	21	"Awaken"; Transliteration: "Mezame" (Japanese: 目醒め)	Yūsuke Kubo	Kazuo Nogami	Kazuyuki Fudeyasu	September 1, 2022	December 3, 2022
174	22	"Time for Heaven! New Moon! New Priest!"; Transliteration: "Tengoku no Toki! Shingetsu no Toki! Nyū Shinpu!" (Japanese: 天国の時！新月の時！新(ニュー)神父！)	Taizō Yoshida	Tōru Hamasaki	Kazuyuki Fudeyasu	September 1, 2022	December 10, 2022
175	23	"Jail House Lock! / Lock of the Jail!"; Transliteration: "Jeiru Hausu Rokku!" (Japanese: ジェイル・ハウス・ロック!)	Mamoru Kurosawa	Shigeki Awai	Yasuko Kobayashi	September 1, 2022	December 17, 2022
176	24	"Jailbreak..."; Transliteration: "Datsugoku e..." (Japanese: 脱獄へ・・・)	Tomohiro Furukawa	Eiichi Kuboyama	Shōgo Yasukawa	September 1, 2022	December 24, 2022
177	25	"Bohemian Rhapsody (1) / Bohemian Ecstatic (1)"; Transliteration: "Bohemian Rapusodī Sono Ichi" (Japanese: 自由人の狂想曲(ボヘミアン・ラプソディー) その①)	Koji Iwai	Hasutani Toru	Shōgo Yasukawa	December 1, 2022	January 7, 2023
178	26	"Bohemian Rhapsody (2) / Bohemian Ecstatic (2)"; Transliteration: "Bohemian Rapusodī Sono Ni" (Japanese: 自由人の狂想曲(ボヘミアン・ラプソディー) その②)	Tatsuma Minamikawa	Fumihiro Ueno	Shōgo Yasukawa	December 1, 2022	January 14, 2023
179	27	"Sky High / Sky Guy"; Transliteration: "Sukai Hai" (Japanese: スカイ・ハイ)	Yasufumi Soejima	Tsutomu Murakami	Shin'ichi Inotsume	December 1, 2022	January 21, 2023
180	28	"Heaven Is at Hand: Three Days Until the New Moon"; Transliteration: "Tengoku no Toki: Shingetsu Made Ato San-Nichi" (Japanese: 天国の時 新月まであと3日)	Shinji Itadaki	Tetsuji Nakamura	Kazuyuki Fudeyasu	December 1, 2022	January 28, 2023
181	29	"Under World / Netherworld"; Transliteration: "Andā Wārudo" (Japanese: アンダー・ワールド)	Mamoru Kurosawa	Tatsuya Kyogoku	Kazuyuki Fudeyasu	December 1, 2022	February 4, 2023
182	30	"Heavy Weather (1) / Heavy Forecast (1)"; Transliteration: "Hebī Wezā Sono Ichi" (Japanese: ヘビー・ウェザー その①)	Jirō Fujimoto	Junya Jitsusei	Shin'ichi Inotsume	December 1, 2022	February 11, 2023
183	31	"Heavy Weather (2) / Heavy Forecast (2)"; Transliteration: "Hebī Wezā Sono Ni" (Japanese: ヘビー・ウェザー その②)	Yūsuke Kubo	Yūsuke Kubo	Shin'ichi Inotsume	December 1, 2022	February 18, 2023
184	32	"Heavy Weather (3) / Heavy Forecast (3)"; Transliteration: "Hebī Wezā Sono San" (Japanese: ヘビー・ウェザー その③)	Shinji Itadaki	Shinji Nagata	Yasuko Kobayashi	December 1, 2022	February 25, 2023
185	33	"Gravity of the New Moon"; Transliteration: "Shingetsu no Jūryoku" (Japanese: 新月の重力)	Koji Iwai	Tetsuji Nakamura	Kazuyuki Fudeyasu	December 1, 2022	March 4, 2023
186	34	"C-Moon (1) / See Moon (1)"	Taizo Yoshida	Eiichi Kuboyama	Shōgo Yasukawa	December 1, 2022	March 11, 2023
187	35	"C-Moon (2) / See Moon (2)"	Mamoru Kurosawa	Shohei Miyake	Shōgo Yasukawa	December 1, 2022	March 18, 2023
188	36	"Made in Heaven (1) / Maiden Heaven (1)"; Transliteration: "Meido in Hebun Sono Ichi" (Japanese: メイド・イン・ヘブン その①)	Katsuichi Nakayama	Katsuichi Nakayama	Shōgo Yasukawa	December 1, 2022	March 25, 2023
189	37	"Made in Heaven (2) / Maiden Heaven (2)"; Transliteration: "Meido in Hebun Sono Ni" (Japanese: メイド・イン・ヘブン その②)	Shinji Itadaki, Kenichi Suzuki	Hasutani Toru	Shin'ichi Inotsume	December 1, 2022	April 1, 2023
190	38	"What a Wonderful World / It's a Wonderful World"; Transliteration: "Howatto a Wandafuru Wārudo" (Japanese: ホワット・ア・ワンダフル・ワールド)	Katsuichi Nakayama, Mamoru Kurosawa	Toshiyuki Kato, Kenichi Suzuki	Yasuko Kobayashi	December 1, 2022	April 8, 2023

=== Season 6: Steel Ball Run (2026) ===
No. overall	No. in season	Title	Directed by (Note: Production staff information is taken from the ending credits of each episode.)	Written by	Storyboarded by	Original release date
1st Stage
191	1	"Steel Ball Run"; Transliteration: "Sutīru Bōru Ran" (Japanese: スティール・ボール・ラン)	Toshiyuki Kato & Yasuhiro Kimura	Yasuko Kobayashi	Toshiyuki Kato & Yasuhiro Kimura	March 19, 2026 (Note: Episode 191 is a 47-minute special)
2nd & 3rd Stage
192	2	"The Sheriff's Request to Mountain Tim"; Transliteration: "Maunten Timu e no Irai" (Japanese: マウンテン・ティムへの依頼)	Hirofumi Ogura	Shinichi Inotsume	Taizo Yoshida	September 25, 2026
193	3	"The Desert-Born Outlaws"; Transliteration: "Sabaku de Umareta Narazumono" (Japanese: 砂漠で生まれたならず者)	Shūgo Tsuneoka	Shōgo Yasukawa	Shūgo Tsuneoka	October 2, 2026
194	4	"The Devil's Palm"; Transliteration: "Akuma no Tenohira" (Japanese: 悪魔の手のひら)	Kayona Yamada	Shōgo Yasukawa	Toshiyuki Katō	October 9, 2026
195	5	"The Terrorist from a Faraway Country"; Transliteration: "Tōi Kuni kara Kita Terorisuto" (Japanese: 遠い国から来たテロリスト)	Shūgo Tsuneoka	Kazuyuki Fudeyasu	Yoriyasu Kogawa	October 16, 2026
196	6	"Gyro Zeppeli's Destiny"; Transliteration: "Jairo Tseperi no Shukumei" (Japanese: ジャイロ・ツェペリの宿命)	Fukutarō Takahashi	Kazuyuki Fudeyasu	Yoriyasu Kogawa	October 23, 2026
