= JoJo's Bizarre Adventure (TV series) =

Japanese anime television series

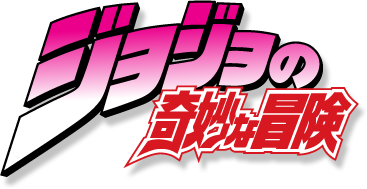
- ジョジョの奇妙な冒険; JoJo no Kimyō na Bōken
- Also known as: List: JoJo's Bizarre Adventure: Phantom Blood (S1A); JoJo's Bizarre Adventure: Battle Tendency (S1B); JoJo's Bizarre Adventure: Stardust Crusaders (S2) (Note: The second half of the season was additionally subtitled as "Stardust Crusaders: Battle in Egypt".); JoJo's Bizarre Adventure: Diamond Is Unbreakable (S3); JoJo's Bizarre Adventure: Golden Wind (S4); JoJo's Bizarre Adventure: Stone Ocean (S5); Steel Ball Run: JoJo's Bizarre Adventure (S6)
- Genre: Adventure; Supernatural
- Based on: JoJo's Bizarre Adventure
- Created by: Hirohiko Araki
- Directed by: Naokatsu Tsuda (S1–4) (Note: Director (S1–3), Executive Director (S4)); Kenichi Suzuki (S1–2, S5) (Note: Series Director (S1–2), Executive Director (S5)); Toshiyuki Kato (S2–3, S5–6) (Note: Chief Episode Director (S2), Series Director (S3, S6), Director (S5)); Yasuhiro Kimura (S4, S6) (Note: Director); Hideya Takahashi (S4, S6)
- Series composition: Yasuko Kobayashi
- Character designers: Takako Shimizu (S1); Masahiko Kominami (S2); Terumi Nishii (S3); Takahiro Kishida (S4); Masa Ritsu (S5); Daisuke Tsumagari (S6)
- Music by: Hayato Matsuo (S1A); Taku Iwasaki (S1B); Yugo Kanno (S2–6)
- Voices of: Kazuyuki Okitsu; Tomokazu Sugita; Daisuke Ono; Yūki Ono; Kensho Ono; Fairouz Ai; Shogo Sakata
- Narrated by: Tōru Ōkawa (S1–5); Yōji Ueda (S6)
- No. of seasons: 6
- No. of episodes: 200 (list of episodes)

Production
- Sound director: Miwa Iwanami
- Cinematographer: Kazuhiro Yamada
- Color designers: Eriko Murata (S1); Yuko Sato (S2-6)
- Editor: Kiyoshi Hirose
- Animation producers: Koji Kajita (S1–3); Toshitaka Kasama (S4), (S6); Honjoya Reo (S5)
- Studio: David Production
- Producers: List: Hiroyuki Oomori; Toshiyasu Hayashi; Ryousuke Mori (S1–3); Jun Fukuda (S1–3); Takamitsu Sueyoshi (S4–5); Souji Miyagi (S4); Noriko Dohi (S5); Fumihiro Ozawa (S5)
- Production companies: JoJo's Bizarre Adventure Production Committee (Note: Label consisting of numerous companies. It changes each season to reflect the subtitle initials.)
- Runtime: 23 minutes; 47 minutes (#191)

Original release
- Networks: Tokyo MX, MBS, BS11, Animax (S1–5) (Note: The fifth season was broadcast on these listed Japanese television networks shortly following its international distribution on Netflix. It has yet to be announced whether the sixth season will follow suit.); TBC (S1–3); RKB, CBC TV (S1–2); Netflix (S5–6)
- Release: October 6, 2012 – present

Related
- JoJo's Bizarre Adventure (1993–2002 OVAs)

JoJo's Bizarre Adventure (Japanese: ジョジョの奇妙な冒険, Hepburn: JoJo no Kimyō na Bōken), also known as JoJo's Bizarre Adventure: The Animation, is a Japanese anime television series produced by David Production. The adaptation of the Japanese manga series of the same name by Hirohiko Araki, the series focuses on the mysterious adventures of the Joestar family across generations, from the end of the 19th century to the modern era. The series was first broadcast on Tokyo MX before entering syndication on 4 JNN stations (MBS, TBC, RKB, and CBC TV), BS11, and Animax.

The first season, adapting the first two parts, Phantom Blood and Battle Tendency, aired in Japan between October 2012 and April 2013. The series is distributed in North America by Warner Bros. Home Entertainment and Viz Media, with the former handling the series on DVD and the latter handling the series on Blu-Ray and the merchandising rights. In the United States, it aired on Adult Swim's Toonami programming block starting in October 2016.

A second season adapting the manga's third part, Stardust Crusaders, aired between April and September 2014, with a second part airing between January and June 2015. A third season covering the fourth part, Diamond Is Unbreakable, aired from April to December 2016. A fourth season covering the fifth part, Golden Wind, aired from October 2018 to July 2019. A fifth season covering the sixth part, Stone Ocean, was released worldwide on Netflix from December 2021 to December 2022. A sixth season covering the seventh part, Steel Ball Run, will be releasing worldwide on the same streaming service, which began with a 47-minute first episode in March 2026. As of November 2026, the series consists of a total of 199 episodes across six seasons.

== Premise ==
JoJo's Bizarre Adventure tells the story of the Joestar family, a family whose various members discover they are destined to take down supernatural foes using powers that they possess. The story is split up into unique parts, each following a member of the Joestar family, who typically have names that can be abbreviated to the titular "JoJo".

== Release ==
On July 5, 2012, at a press conference celebrating the 25th anniversary of JoJo's Bizarre Adventure and promoting series creator Hirohiko Araki's then-upcoming art exhibition, Araki and his people announced that an anime adaptation of JoJo's Bizarre Adventure was in production and would premiere in October 2012. In August 2012, it was announced that the series would be produced by David Production. The first season of JoJo's Bizarre Adventure covered the first two parts of the manga, Phantom Blood and Battle Tendency. It aired for 26 episodes on Tokyo MX between October 6, 2012, and April 6, 2013.

Although teased at in the post-credit scenes of the finale, the second season of the anime series, which covered the third part of the manga, Stardust Crusaders, was officially announced in the 47th issue of Weekly Shōnen Jump and the fifth tankōbon volume of JoJolion in October 2013. It was broadcast on Tokyo MX in two parts for a total of 48 episodes; the first from April 5 to September 13, 2014, and the second from January 10 to June 20, 2015. The Japanese broadcast censored scenes of underage characters smoking by overlaying black shadows on them.

In October 2015, at the "Last Crusaders" event for Stardust Crusaders, a third season and adaptation of the fourth part of the manga, Diamond Is Unbreakable, was announced. It premiered on April 1, 2016, and ended on December 23, 2016. An original video animation (OVA) adapting the Thus Spoke Rohan Kishibe manga spin-offs to people who had purchased all thirteen Japanese DVD or Blu-ray volumes of the Diamond Is Unbreakable anime series.

On June 21, 2018, at the "Ripples of Adventure" art exhibition, a fourth season and adaptation of the fifth part of the manga, Golden Wind, was announced. The pilot debuted at Anime Expo on July 6, 2018, and formally aired from October 5, 2018, to July 28, 2019, on Tokyo MX.

On April 4, 2021, at the JOESTAR The Inherited Soul, which featured the cast of main characters from each part of the series, it was announced a fifth season and adaptation of the sixth part of the manga, Stone Ocean. It was streamed worldwide on Netflix from December 1, 2021, to December 1, 2022.

On April 12, 2025, at the JOJODAY promotional event, a sixth season and adaptation of the seventh part of the manga, Steel Ball Run, was announced. It premiered on Netflix on March 19, 2026, with a 47-minute first episode.

With the 2014 premiere of Stardust Crusaders, American-based website Crunchyroll began streaming the anime series for viewers outside Japan an hour after it aired in Japan. Warner Home Video released Parts 1 and 2 in a DVD set on September 22, 2015, with an English dub. In July 2016, Viz Media announced they acquired the Blu-ray rights to the series and released it with an English dub in July 2017. On October 15, 2016, American cable block Adult Swim began airing the anime on its Toonami block.

== Reception ==
=== Sales ===
The first DVD release of the TV anime was the fourth best-selling animation DVD in Japan for the week of January 28 to February 3, 2013, with 4,510 copies sold. Its Blu-ray version was the fourth best-selling animation Blu-ray for that same week, with 14,860 copies sold. The second volume ranked sixth in both animation DVDs and Blu-rays for the week of February 18–24, with 2,764 and 12,501 copies sold respectively. The anime's third volume was the sixth best-selling animation DVD, with 2,994 copies sold, and the second best-selling animation Blu-ray, with 13,536 copies sold, for the week of March 25–31.

=== Critical reception ===
The JoJo's Bizarre Adventure anime television series was named one of the best of 2012 by Otaku USA. It was added to the list by Joseph Luster, however, in his review he cited David Production having a small budget for several of his problems with the series, stating some portions of the animation are a "butt hair above motion comic standards," but that it usually makes up for it in "sheer style." Michael Toole of Anime News Network had similar views, writing that the show's good writing, art direction, and pacing were "sometimes obscured by grade-Z animation."

Several critics have credited the success of the anime adaptation for bringing about a surge of popularity for the JoJo's Bizarre Adventure franchise amongst Western audiences. In 2018, Danni Wilmoth of Crunchyroll included the series on her list of "The 20 Series Every Anime Fan Needs to Watch". In 2019, Polygon named the series as one of the best anime of the 2010s.

=== Accolades ===
At the 2013 CEDEC Awards, the anime's opening sequence won in the Visual Arts division. At the Crunchyroll Anime Awards, the anime's Diamond is Unbreakable received three category mentions in the most popular "Other" in 2017: "Best Action" and both Hero of the Year and Best Boy for Josuke Higashikata, while Yoshikage Kira was nominated for Villain of the Year; Takahiro Kishida won "Best Character Design" for the anime's Golden Wind and its opening theme, "Fighting Gold" by Coda, was nominated for "Best Opening Sequence" in 2019; Yuichi Nakamura won Best Voice Artist Performance (Japanese) for his work as Bruno Bucciarati, while Golden Wind was nominated for three categories in 2020; Marios Gavrilis was nominated for Best Voice Artist Performance (German) for his work as Dio Brando in 2022; the anime's Stone Ocean was nominated for six categories, including Best Action and Best Continuing Series in 2023. Gadget Tsūshin listed "Pesci, Pesci, Pesci, Pesci yo!", a quote from the fifteenth episode of Golden Wind, in their 2019 anime buzzwords list. In 2026, the anime's Steel Ball Run was nominated at the 6th Astra TV Awards in the Best Anime Series category.

== See also ==
- JoJo's Bizarre Adventure – An earlier OVA adaptation, 13 episodes released in two parts. The first 6 episodes were released during 1993–1994 and the later (but narratively earlier) 7 episodes were released during 2000–2002 by Studio APPP. This series was adapted from Part 3: Stardust Crusaders of the original manga, also the basis for the second season of the 2012 TV series.
