= JoJo's Bizarre Adventure (OVA) =

1993–2002 original video animation

- Cover art for the first Japanese DVD volume

ジョジョの奇妙な冒険 (JoJo no Kimyō na Bōken)
- Original video animation
- Directed by: Hiroyuki Kitakubo
- Produced by: Kazufumi Nomura; Tetsuo Daitoku
- Written by: Hiroyuki Kitakubo (#1–3); Satoshi Kon (#4–6)
- Music by: Marco D'Ambrosio
- Studio: A.P.P.P.
- Licensed by: NA: Super Techno Arts
- Released: November 19, 1993 – November 18, 1994
- Runtime: 34–37 minutes (each)
- Episodes: 6
- Original video animation
- Directed by: List: Hideki Nimura (chief); Noboru Furuse (#1); Yasuhito Kikuchi (#2); Yasunori Urata (#3); Takashi Kobayashi (#4–5, 7); Eiji Yamanaka (#6)
- Produced by: Kazufumi Nomura; Kazuhiko Yusa; Mutsumi Yasaka; Tsuneo Takechi (#2–4); Shigeaki Tomioka (#5–7)
- Written by: Kenichi Takashima (#1–2, 6–7); Takao Kawaguchi (#3–5)
- Music by: Marco D'Ambrosio
- Studio: A.P.P.P.
- Licensed by: NA: Super Techno Arts
- Released: May 25, 2000 – October 25, 2002
- Runtime: 27–32 minutes (each)
- Episodes: 7
- icon

JoJo's Bizarre Adventure (Japanese: ジョジョの奇妙な冒険, Hepburn: JoJo no Kimyō na Bōken) is an original video animation adaptation of Hirohiko Araki's manga series of the same name. Produced by A.P.P.P. (Another Push Pin Planning), it was adapted from the series' third part, Stardust Crusaders.

== Plot ==
Set in 1987, the series follows Jotaro Kujo, who has developed a mysterious power known as a Stand. Jotaro, his grandfather Joseph Joestar, and their comrades travel to Egypt in search of the vampire Dio Brando, to save Jotaro's mother Holly, whose Stand has awakened due to Dio's re-emergence and threatens to consume her in 50 days. Dio commissions a number of Stand wielding assassins to halt the group's advance, and eventually has to fight the group himself.

== Release ==
The first six episodes were originally released by Pony Canyon on VHS and Laserdisc from 1993 to 1994, adapting the latter half of the story arc. This set of episodes begins with Jotaro Kujo and his companions in the middle of their quest to find Dio Brando, offering very little exposition to the back-story that led to the present events of the OVA.

The second series, consisting of seven episodes, were released by Klock Worx on DVD and VHS from 2000 to 2002, featuring most of the same cast and character designs, but produced with different directors and writers. These additional episodes, titled adventure 1 through 7, served as a prequel to the earlier-produced episodes, adapting the beginning of the story arc that featured the circumstances that led to Jotaro's quest. The earlier episodes were subsequently re-released as part of this series, but renumbered as adventure 8 through 13 to take into account their later chronological placement. A DVD box set featuring all 13 episodes was released on May 25, 2007, which included a soundtrack CD and a set of 31 tarot cards illustrated by Hirohiko Araki.

The series was released in North America by Super Techno Arts. It was released on six DVD volumes from 2003 to 2005, dubbed in English, with all 13 episodes also featured in chronological order.

In 2008, distribution for the Jojo's Bizarre Adventure OVA series was indefinitely suspended following the controversy over the presence of the Qur'an in Episode 6.

The same story arc was later adapted for JoJo's Bizarre Adventure: Stardust Crusaders, the second season of the Jojo TV series which aired from 2014 to 2015.

=== Episodes ===
Episodes listed by their English dub titles and in order of their fictional chronology (the second series before the first series, as used in the post-2000 releases of the episodes).

No.	Title	Original release date
1	"The Evil Spirit"/ "Stand"; Transliteration: "Akuryō" (Japanese: 悪霊)	May 25, 2000
Seventeen-year-old Jotaro Kujo refuses to leave his jail cell, believing that he is possessed by an evil spirit. When Jotaro's mother, Holly, his grandfather Joseph Joestar, and the mysterious Mohammed Avdol come to try to coax him out, a battle erupts between Avdol's "evil spirit" Magician's Red and Jotaro's Star Platinum, revealed to be psychic manifestations known as Stands.
2	"Hierophant Green"; Transliteration: "Haierofanto Gurīn" (Japanese: 法皇の緑(ハイエロファントグリーン))	August 25, 2000
Jotaro learns the secret of his Stand power and about his family's enemy, the vampire Dio. Later, Jotaro is attacked by Noriaki Kakyoin and his Stand Hierophant Green, an assassin controlled by Dio. When Holly falls into a Stand-induced coma, Joseph, Jotaro, and the others embark on a dangerous journey to Egypt to save her life and end the 100-year battle between Dio and the Joestar family.
3	"Silver Chariot and Strength"; Transliteration: "Shirubā Chariottsu to Sutorengusu" (Japanese: 銀の戦車(シルバーチャリオッツ)&力(ストレングス))	October 27, 2000
When the private jet carrying Jotaro and his companions to Egypt suddenly bursts into flames, the plane is forced to land in the ocean. As the party drifts in a lifeboat, a large freighter pulls alongside and they climb aboard. To their shock, there is no crew to be found—and the only passengers left aboard are an orangutan and enemy Stand user Jean-Pierre Polnareff, user of Silver Chariot. However, Polnareff is another one of Dio's unwilling victims, and soon joins the group as they face off against the orangutan Forever and his Stand Strength.
4	"The Emperor and the Hanged Man"; Transliteration: "Enperā to Hangudoman" (Japanese: 皇帝(エンペラー)と吊られた男(ハングドマン))	April 27, 2001
At a stopover on the way to Egypt, Polnareff is attacked by the Stand known as the Hanged Man, an enemy Stand who has two right hands and can only be seen in reflections. Realizing that it must be controlled by the same Stand user that had killed his younger sister, Polnareff breaks away from the rest of the group to seek his revenge. Polnareff is lured into a trap set by J. Geil, user of the Hanged Man and his partner, Hol Horse. When some of the party come to his aid, Avdol is killed by Hol Horse's Stand the Emperor.
5	"The Judgement"; Transliteration: "Sabaki" (Japanese: 裁き)	June 29, 2001
Kakyoin and Polnareff desperately seek a way to defeat the Hanged Man, who can strike out at them from within reflections while remaining invulnerable to their attacks. They must figure out a way to fight a Stand that can move at nearly the speed of light and can attack from anywhere.
6	"The Mist of Vengeance"; Transliteration: "Hōfuku no Kiri" (Japanese: 報復の霧)	September 28, 2001
A thick fog envelopes the group as they travel towards Egypt, so they seek refuge in a nearby town. There, the companions stumble across a strangely mutilated dead body lying on a street corner. An old woman arrives on the scene with the police, and offers to let them stay at her hotel for the night. In the hotel bar, Polnareff encounters Enya, a beautiful and mysterious young woman on a deadly quest of revenge of her own as Polnareff has killed her son J. Geil.
7	"Justice"; Transliteration: "Jasutisu" (Japanese: 正義 -ジャスティス-)	January 25, 2002
Polnareff becomes a living puppet under the control of Enya and her incredible mist of death Stand Justice. The group battles its way out of the hotel, only to find themselves surrounded by legions of the dead. All seems lost when Jotaro falls prey to a bizarre sneak attack, leaving him vulnerable to Enya's control as well. However, he soon comes up with a way to reveal the true identity of their foe.
8	"Iggy 'The Fool' and N'Doul 'The GEB' (Part I)"; Transliteration: ""Za Fūru" no Igī to "Gebu-shin" no Ndūru -Zenpen-" (Japanese: 「愚者」のイギーと「ゲブ神」のンドゥール -前編-)	November 21, 1993
Jotaro and his companions finally reach Egypt. There, they are met by a Speedwagon Foundation helicopter that delivers a new addition to their group—a dog named Iggy who is actually the user of The Fool Stand. When the helicopter crashes just a short time later, the group investigates, only to find themselves pitted against another of Dio's assassins—N'Doul and his deadly Stand, the Egyptian god Geb.
9	"Iggy 'The Fool' and N'Doul 'The GEB' (Part II)"; Transliteration: ""Za Fūru" no Igī to "Gebu-shin" no Ndūru -Kōhen-" (Japanese: 「愚者」のイギーと「ゲブ神」のンドゥール -後編-)	December 17, 1993
Jotaro and the others find themselves stranded and at the mercy of N'Doul's incredibly strong and mercurial Stand Geb. Faced with almost certain death, Jotaro makes a desperate gambit and forces Iggy to help him strike back at N'Doul, but Iggy has other plans. He betrays Jotaro at a critical moment, offering him to Geb in order to save his own life.
10	"D'Arby the Gambler"; Transliteration: "Dābī Za Gyanburā" (Japanese: ダービー・ザ・ギャンブラー)	July 21, 1994
The companions search the huge Egyptian capital of Cairo, showing everyone they meet the photo of a mysterious building where they think Dio resides. In an odd café, they encounter a gambler named D'Arby who claims to have the information they need. The catch is, they have to beat him in the ultimate wager—one where their very souls are at stake thanks to the use of his Stand Osiris. After Polnareff and Joseph fall victim to D'Arby's cheats, Jotaro must come up with a way to out gamble a gambler.
11	"Dio's 'The World' - The Warrior of the Void - Vanilla Ice"; Transliteration: "Dio no Sekai -Akū no Shōki Vanira Aisu-" (Japanese: Dioの世界 -亜空の瘴気ヴァニラ・アイス-)	August 9, 1994
Jotaro and his companions finally arrive at Dio's lair and find their way to the room where his coffin resides. Just as they prepare to strike the fatal blow, Dio's mysterious Stand powers, coupled with that of his finest assassin, Vanilla Ice, slay Avdol before their horrified eyes. Jotaro, Joseph, and Kakyoin go after Dio, hoping to kill him before the sun sets when he will have free rein over the city, while Polnareff and Iggy get revenge for Avdol's death against Vanilla Ice.
12	"Dio's 'The World' - Kakyoin - Duel in the Barrier"; Transliteration: "Dio no Sekai -Kakyōin: Kekkai no Shitō-" (Japanese: Dioの世界 -花京院 結界の死闘-)	October 21, 1994
Dio pursues Joseph through the streets of Cairo, leaving an incredible swath of death and destruction in his wake. Kakyoin comes to Joseph's aid, only to be crushed by the power of Dio's Stand The World. As Kakyoin lies alone and dying, he realizes in the last moments of life the true nature of Dio's Stand, and he attempts to send them one final message to reveal that The World can stop time.
13	"Dio's 'The World' - Farewell, My Friends"; Transliteration: "Dio no Sekai -Saraba Tomo yo-" (Japanese: Dioの世界 -さらば友よ-)	November 18, 1994
The century-old blood feud finally comes to a close in the final battle between Jotaro and Dio. The World seems invincible as Jotaro is struck time and time again with murderous blows. If Jotaro cannot discover the secret of Dio's Stand and find some way to counter it, the Joestar line will come to an abrupt and bloody end.

== Reception ==
=== Critical reception ===
The first set of OVAs was given three out of five stars by Eric Gaede of THEM Anime Reviews. He praised the fight scenes as more believable than those from other series such as Dragon Ball and the characters' personalities, although felt the villains resorted to clichés when they are about to be defeated. However, he called the story "disjointed" and the animation "drab and colorless".

=== Controversy ===
In May 2008, both studio A.P.P.P. and Shueisha halted OVA/manga shipments of JoJo's Bizarre Adventure after a complaint had been launched against them from Egyptian Islamic fundamentalists, after noticing a scene in the OVAs that has the villain, Dio Brando, reading a book depicting pages from the Qur'an. This recall affected the English-language release of the manga as well, causing Viz Media and Shueisha to cease publication for a year. Additionally, the OVAs were pulled altogether, and there are currently no plans to re-release them anywhere. Even though the manga did not feature that specific scene, Shueisha had Araki redraw scenes that depicted characters fighting on top of, and destroying, mosques.

== Legacy ==
Satoshi Kon's screenwriting work on the series attracted the attention of Madhouse producer Masao Maruyama, who offered Kon a directing position on the film Perfect Blue. The film would be met with critical acclaim and mark the start of Kon's successful directing career.
