= Stardust Crusaders =

Third story arc of JoJo's Bizarre Adventure

- JoJo's Bizarre Adventure volume 13 cover, featuring Jotaro Kujo and his Stand, Star Platinum

スターダストクルセイダース (Sutādasuto Kuruseidāsu)
- Genre: Adventure, supernatural
- Manga
- Written by: Hirohiko Araki
- Published by: Shueisha
- English publisher: NA: Viz Media
- Imprint: Jump Comics
- Magazine: Weekly Shōnen Jump
- Original run: April 3, 1989 – April 27, 1992
- Volumes: 16
- Other media
- OVA series (1993–1994, 2000–2002); Video game (1998); Animated TV series (2014–2015)
- Chronology
- Preceded by: Battle Tendency; Followed by: Diamond Is Unbreakable
- icon

Stardust Crusaders (Japanese: スターダストクルセイダース, Hepburn: Sutādasuto Kuruseidāsu) is the third main story arc of the manga series JoJo's Bizarre Adventure written and illustrated by Hirohiko Araki. The arc was serialized for a little over 3 years. It was serialized in Shueisha's Weekly Shōnen Jump from April 3, 1989, to April 27, 1992, for 152 chapters, which were later collected into 16 tankōbon volumes. In its original publication, it was known as JoJo's Bizarre Adventure Part 3 Jotaro Kujo: Heritage for the Future (ジョジョの奇妙な冒険 第三部 空条承太郎 —未来への遺産—, JoJo no Kimyō na Bōken Dai San Bu Kūjō Jōtarō -Mirai e no Isan-). The arc was preceded by Battle Tendency and followed by Diamond Is Unbreakable.

The story is set long after the events of Battle Tendency and follows Joseph Joestar's grandson Jotaro Kujo, a Japanese high school delinquent who awakens Star Platinum, a manifestation of his fighting spirit known as a Stand with superhuman abilities. Alongside his grandfather and other Stand-users, they are tasked to go on a journey to Cairo, Egypt, in order to defeat Dio, who is revealed to be alive and is seeking revenge on the Joestar family.

In 2012, Stardust Crusaders was digitally colored and released as digital downloads for smartphones and tablet computers. A ten-volume hardcover re-release under the title JoJonium (Note: JoJonium (ジョジョニウム, Jojoniumu)) was published in 2014 and 2015. Viz Media initially released the sixteen-volume format of the arc in North America between 2005 and 2010. They released the hardcover format from 2016 to 2019.

It is one of the most popular parts of the JoJo's Bizarre Adventure series as it introduced the audience to the concept of Stands, which differentiated it from its predecessors. This popularity later spawned video games, a three volume drama CD series, two novels and two OVA series of this arc alone. An anime television adaptation by David Production, JoJo's Bizarre Adventure: Stardust Crusaders, aired in Japan between April 2014 and June 2015.

Stardust Crusaders also stands out as the only arc of the series to gain any notable Western exposure prior to the release of the anime series by David Production in 2012, due to the 1993 OVA series, 1999 video game and the English releases of the manga in 2005–2010.

== Plot ==
In Japan, 1987, (Note: The arc's setting was later changed to 1988.) Jotaro Kujo, grandson of Joseph Joestar, has been arrested, and refuses to leave his cell, believing he is possessed by an evil spirit. After being called by Holly, Joseph's daughter and Jotaro's mother, Joseph arrives with an associate, Mohammed Avdol. They explain that Jotaro's "evil spirit" is actually a manifestation of his fighting spirit, called a Stand, and reveal that they possess Stands as well. Joseph explains that the sudden appearance of their Stands is caused by the nemesis of his grandfather, Jonathan Joestar: Dio Brando, now simply referred to as Dio (stylized in all caps). Dio has survived his final battle with Jonathan by decapitating his nemesis's corpse and attaching his own head to it. Now preparing for global conquest, Dio has awoken his own Stand (which awakens the Stands of the rest of the Joestar bloodline due to his use of Jonathan's body) and recruited Stand-using assassins to kill Jonathan's remaining descendants. Soon after, Jotaro uses his Stand, which is later named Star Platinum, to defeat the first of these assassins, a transfer student named Noriaki Kakyoin, before freeing Kakyoin from Dio's control by removing a parasitic flesh bud from him. Holly soon becomes gravely ill due to a Stand manifesting in her, which is slowly killing her due to her weak personality. With little hesitation, Jotaro, Joseph, Avdol, and Kakyoin begin a journey to Egypt to kill Dio and save Holly's life. On the way, they defeat another brainwashed assassin named Jean Pierre Polnareff who later joins the quest to kill Dio and avenge the death of his sister, whose murderer is among Dio's forces.

Forced to travel on foot after Dio's assassins manage to foil their travel by plane and ship, the group encounter Hol Horse and the murderer of Polnareff's sister, J. Geil, in Calcutta, with Avdol seemingly killed during the confrontation. Polnareff kills J. Geil with Kakyoin's help, and the remaining group travels further into Pakistan. After defeating Geil's mother, a Dio loyalist named Enya, the group reach the Red Sea, where Polnareff learns Avdol faked his death to acquire a submarine that allows them to reach Egypt.

Upon arriving in Abu Simbel, the heroes are joined by Iggy, a Boston Terrier with a Stand of his own, while facing the first of nine Stands named after Egyptian deities (rather than the tarot theme of before). Kakyoin is wounded in the fight, and is taken to a hospital to recuperate. After the group defeats several more Stand users while reaching Cairo, Iggy discovers and leads them to Dio's mansion, with Kakyoin rejoining them. At the mansion's entrance, the party is split up- Jotaro, Joseph, and Kakyoin fight the last of the nine Egyptian god Stands, while Polnareff, Avdol, and Iggy make their way through the mansion. However, one of Dio's servants, Vanilla Ice, kills Avdol and Iggy, both of whom separately sacrifice themselves to save Polnareff. An enraged Polnareff battles Vanilla Ice and discovers that Vanilla Ice has been transformed into a vampire like Dio, a fact that Vanilla Ice himself was unaware of. Polnareff floods the room with light, disintegrating Vanilla Ice and avenging his friends whose spirits peacefully head to Heaven.

Jotaro, Joseph, Kakyoin, and Polnareff ultimately encounter Dio, and escape his mansion. A chase across Cairo follows, leading to Kakyoin confronting Dio and his Stand, The World, whose power Dio has taken great lengths to keep secret (having previously assassinated Enya to keep her from telling the heroes). Though fatally wounded by The World, Kakyoin manages to deduce the Stand's ability to stop time for five seconds and covertly relays it to Joseph in his final moments. Joseph is able to pass it on to Jotaro, but is swiftly killed by Dio, who uses his blood to increase the duration of his ability to nine seconds. With most of his allies dead and Polnareff unconscious, Jotaro is left to fight Dio alone. During the fight, both sides discover that their respective Stands are similar in both range, power, and ability, meaning that Jotaro is able to use The World's time-stopping powers as well. Jotaro first uses this ability to briefly move around while Dio has stopped time, but he learns how to stop time directly when Dio tries to crush him with a road roller. Dio attempts to kill Jotaro with one final kick, but a counterattack from Jotaro splits The World in two, killing it and Dio. Jotaro transfuses the blood that Dio took back into Joseph and uses Star Platinum to restart his stopped heart (an ability he'd previously used on himself while playing dead during the fight with Dio), reviving him. The two Joestars then expose Dio's corpse to the sun, destroying the vampire for good. Jotaro and Joseph bid Polnareff farewell before returning to Japan, as Holly has made a full recovery.

== Characters ==
- Jotaro Kujo (Note: Jotaro Kujo (空条 承太郎, Kūjō Jōtarō)) is the delinquent protagonist. He uses the Stand Star Platinum, (Note: Star Platinum (星の白金(スタープラチナ), Sutā Purachina)) whose power is incredible strength, speed, and precision. It is later revealed that Star Platinum also has the power to stop time, which helps him during the final battle with Dio.
- Joseph Joestar (Note: Joseph Joestar (ジョセフ・ジョースター, Josefu Jōsutā)) is Jotaro's grandfather, and the protagonist of the previous part of the series, Battle Tendency. He uses the Stand Hermit Purple, (Note: Hermit Purple (隠者の紫(ハーミットパープル), Hāmitto Pāpuru)) which allows him to produce thorny purple vines that can perform predictions through electronic equipment such as Polaroid cameras or televisions (although at the cost of destroying said equipment); he can also use them to attach to buildings and swing through the air. He also still has access to the vampire-killing martial art known as Hamon, which was his primary ability in Battle Tendency, and can use Hermit Purple as wires to channel Hamon (Ripple) energy, which he uses in the fight with Dio to prevent the vampire from directly attacking him.
- Mohammed Avdol (Note: Mohammed Avdol (モハメド・アヴドゥル, Mohamedo Avuduru)) is a fortune teller from Cairo, and an ally of Joseph and Jotaro. He uses the Stand Magician's Red, (Note: Magician's Red (魔術師の赤(マジシャンズレッド), Majishanzu Reddo)) which allows him to manipulate fire.
- Noriaki Kakyoin (Note: Noriaki Kakyoin (花京院 典明, Kakyōin Noriaki)) is a former enemy turned ally of Jotaro. Kakyoin believed himself a social outcast due to his Stand, which continued up until he met Jotaro. He uses the Stand Hierophant Green, (Note: Hierophant Green (法皇の緑(ハイエロファントグリーン), Haierofanto Gurīn)) which he can unravel into threads to enter people and control them from the inside, or perform a long-ranged attack using blasts of green energy known as Emerald Splash. (Note: Emerald Splash (エメラルドスプラッシュ, Emerarudosupurasshu))
- Jean Pierre Polnareff (Note: Jean Pierre Polnareff (ジャン = ピエール・ポルナレフ, Jan Piēru Porunarefu)) is another former enemy turned ally of Jotaro. Polnareff joins the crew to avenge his younger sister, who was murdered by a man with two right hands. Polnareff uses the Stand Silver Chariot, (Note: Silver Chariot (銀の戦車(シルバーチャリオッツ), Shirubā Chariottsu)) which takes the form of an armored knight wielding a rapier, excelling in fast swordsmanship and close-range fighting; his Stand can shed its armor to increase its agility and speed exponentially at the price of being more vulnerable to attacks. He can also shoot his sword but only once in the battle.
- Iggy (Note: Iggy (イギー, Igī)) is a Boston Terrier who uses the Stand, The Fool, (Note: The Fool (愚者(ザ・フール), Za Fūru)) which manipulates sand and dust.
- Holly Joestar-Kujo (Note: Holly Kujo (空条 ホリィ, Kūjō Horī; alternatively written "Holy" in Japan)) is the daughter of Joseph and the mother of Jotaro. Although most Stands are used for fighting, her unnamed Stand works against her gentle, non-violent soul, slowly making her increasingly sick. It takes on the form of vines with roses and berries.
- Dio, (Note: Dio (DIO(ディオ))) the main antagonist, is a vampire who previously appeared in Phantom Blood. After being presumed dead for 100 years, he has returned from his slumber and attached his disembodied head to the decapitated corpse of his longtime foe, Jonathan Joestar. He uses the Stand The World, (Note: The World (世界(ザ・ワールド), Za Wārudo)) a high-power, short-range Stand similar to Star Platinum, which is capable of stopping time for brief intervals. Possessing Jonathan also lead to Dio gaining the ability to use Jonathan's unnamed stand, a power that manifests similarly to Joseph's Hermit Purple.
- Enya the Hag (Note: Enya the Hag (Enya Geil) (エンヤ婆（エンヤ・ガイル）, En'ya-baa (En'ya Gairu))) is an old woman, who is the confidant of Dio. She uses the Stand Justice, (Note: Justice (正義(ジャスティス), Jasutisu)) which takes the form of a mist that takes control over anyone with an open wound, allowing Enya to control them as she would a marionette.
- Hol Horse (Note: Hol Horse (ホル・ホース, Horu Hōsu)) is a recurring minor antagonist who nearly killed Mohammad Avdol (with the assistance of J. Geil) using his Stand Emperor, (Note: Emperor (皇帝(エンペラー), Enperā)) a long range Stand resembling a gun that can shoot and steer its bullets.
- J. Geil (Note: J. Geil (J・ガイル, Jei Gairu; Centerfold in English adaptations)) is the son of Enya the Hag, and the man who murdered Polnareff's sister, prompting Polnareff to avenge her. J. Geil wields the Stand Hanged Man, (Note: Hanged Man (吊られた男(ハングドマン), Hangudo Man)) a Stand that attacks others in reflections such as mirrors. Hanged Man can also jump from reflection to reflection in a ray of light.
- Steely Dan (Note: Steely Dan (鋼入りの(スティーリー)ダン, Sutīrī Dan)) is a servant of Dio who was sent to assassinate Enya to prevent her from revealing the secret of Dio's stand. He wields the stand Lovers (Note: Lovers (恋人(ラバーズ), Rabāzu)), which is microscopic, and transfers damage done to its user to a selected target by infiltrating their brain.
- Vanilla Ice (Note: Vanilla Ice (ヴァニラ・アイス, Vanira Aisu)) is one of Dio's most loyal servants, going as far as cutting his head off to heal Dio's neck wound. He is revived as a vampire, and fights Polnareff, Iggy, and Avdol in Dio's mansion. He wields the stand Cream, (Note: Cream (クリーム, Kurīmu)) which can swallow itself and turn into a spherical void of nothingness that destroys anything in its path.
- Daniel J. D'Arby (Note: Daniel J. D'Arby (ダニエル・J・ダービー, Danieru Jei Dābī)) is a proficient gambler who wields Osiris, (Note: Osiris (オシリス神, Oshirisu-shin)) a stand that allows him to put people's souls in poker chips after they lose.
- Telence T. D'Arby (Note: Telence T. D'Arby (テレンス・T・ダービー, Terensu Tī Dābī)) is Daniel J. D'Arby's younger brother, and a professional gamer who once even beat a person who was born with an IQ of 190. He wields the stand Atum, (Note: Atum (アトゥム神, Atumu-shin)) which allows him to read people's minds and place their souls into dolls if they lose.
- N'Doul (Note: N'Doul (ンドゥール, Ndūru)) is a minor antagonist. He is a blind assassin hired by Dio and the first of the Egypt 9 Glory Gods the Joestar Group encounters upon entering Egypt, attacking them in the middle of the Sahara. N'Doul wields the Stand Geb, (Note: Geb (ゲブ神, Gebu-shin)) a long-ranged Stand made of water that N'Doul can remotely control and shape into anything to attack his foes from afar, notably as a sharp water stream able to slice flesh.

== Production ==
Having originally planned the series as a trilogy, Araki thought to have the final confrontation set in present-day Japan. But he did not want it to be a tournament affair, which was popular in Weekly Shōnen Jump at the time, and therefore decided to make it a "road movie" inspired by Around the World in Eighty Days. He modeled Jotaro after American actor Clint Eastwood, including his poses and catchphrases. Although the author said the character might seem "rough" compared to other Jump protagonists, Jotaro fits his own image of a hero perfectly as a "loner" who does not do the right thing for attention. Araki said the character wearing his school uniform in the desert has its roots in Mitsuteru Yokoyama's Babel II, and that if he were to draw the part over again, he would base the Stands on Tetsujin 28-go. Araki originally thought of Stands as something inorganic powered by life force. When creating them he often takes inspiration from artifacts such as clothing, masks, and dolls by indigenous peoples, which when fused with something biological or mechanical, makes for a very unique design.

Araki said he had a lot of readers asking him to bring older characters back. Although he is not a fan of bringing them back simply for nostalgia, he did not hesitate having Joseph return from Battle Tendency to save his daughter because it is completely true to the character. The author thought of having Joseph drop out partway through due to his age, but ended up "playing it by ear" as serialization continued. He gave him the role of "navigator", introducing the readers to the Joestar family, Dio, Hamon and Stands, and his own Stand being a support ability rather than offensive. Stands being a succession of the Hamon and Hamon being life energy that spreads across the body through breathing, Araki thought Joseph's Hermit Purple vines wrapping around his body were a visual representation of that.

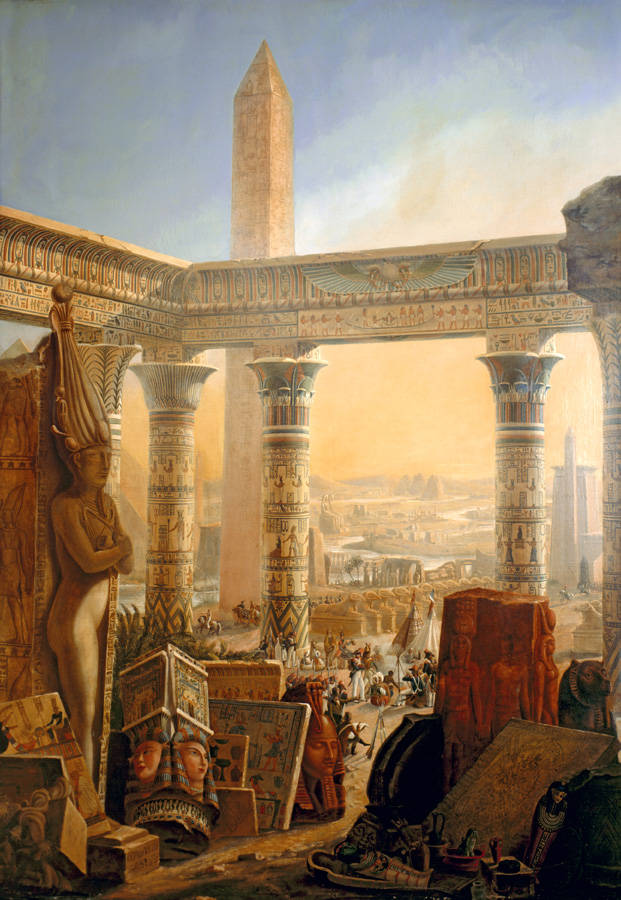
The focus on Egypt and inclusion of an Egyptian main character was reflective of widespread interest in Japanese society regarding "birthplaces of civilization."

Avdol was given the role of "subleader" who acts as navigator, and, with steadfast determination and an unyielding sense of duty, he is the one in the group that everyone can rely on. Araki said he gave him an "ethnic" design to have some sort of connection to Egypt and that at the time of serialization, he and most of the readers had a strong interest in the "birthplaces of civilization", making Avdol's design a "product of the times". Not wanting readers to get complacent, the author took Avdol out of action under the guise of death. Although he intended to bring him back, he did not have specific plans and just wrote what came natural. In hindsight, Araki felt he probably should have given Avdol a section where he played a more primary role, but also believes that he would not have ranked well in a character popularity poll, as the readers only wanted more fights featuring Jotaro. Araki also said that Avdol's Stand was difficult to draw as controlling fire is a common thing in manga and film, and if you "play it too loose" it can break the power balance. As such, fire and poison are two abilities he is okay with barring from future use.

Araki stated that he had Kakyoin act as a foil to Jotaro. Although they both wear school uniforms, Kakyoin's well-tailored one gives him the feel of an honor student, while Jotaro's loose-fitting one and accessories convey that he is a delinquent. He made him Jotaro's first real Stand opponent to visually convey the concepts between short-range and long-range Stand abilities. The author revealed that he always read the kanji for Kakyoin's given name as "Tenmei," but his editor approved the reading Noriaki for the tankōbon much to his surprise. His surname was taken from a town in Sendai.

In order to not have him overlap with Jotaro and Joseph, Polnareff was given a distinctive look and personality, which in turn made him shine on his own, with his lines standing out "for better or for worse". Because he is a versatile character who could say goofy lines or serious ones, he "needed" to make more appearances. More appearances means more fights, and because he made it through so many life-or-death situations, Araki feels that Polnareff grew the most in the story. The author used foreign models as reference for his hair, and also drew it like Rudol von Stroheim's from Battle Tendency. The character's name was inspired by those of Araki's three favorite French people, actors Alain Delon and Jean-Paul Belmondo, and musician Michel Polnareff.

With the series meant to be long-running, Araki took great care in deciding which unique Stand user to put the main cast against and when, in order to keep readers interested. He designed Strength, Ebony Devil, and Yellow Temperance so that their appearances and abilities did not overlap. But as these were all one-on-one battles, he then decided to introduce Hol Horse and J. Geil as a team. He had always planned on having Kakyoin and Polnareff switch allegiances to the good guys, but not Hol Horse. Although he drew a color illustration with Hol Horse alongside the Joestar group and had the character return several times through the story, he suspects he did not go through with it because his personality overlaps with Polnareff's. He also said that because he did not put many limitations on his Stand, it kind of got out of control, plus it overlaps with Kakyoin's Emerald Splash. He did enjoy Hol Horse's "why be number one when you can be number two" philosophy, which the author carried over to Yoshikage Kira in Diamond Is Unbreakable, and his outlaw appearance is similar to that of Gyro Zeppeli from Steel Ball Run and might have been inspired by Buichi Terasawa's Cobra.

Not having any limitations on what he can put in JoJo's Bizarre Adventure, Araki has animals appear and even had one join the Joestar party. Wanting to add an animal as a pet, he chose a dog which to him symbolizes loyalty and friendship. Contradicting what he said in an earlier volume, Araki revealed that just like with Kakyoin and Polnareff, he did not originally plan for Iggy to join the group. Although he feels that The Fool is a perfect fit for Iggy, it just happened to be the last tarot card for him to assign aside from The World. Additionally, he thought of assigning The Fool to an enemy instead, but things just "ended up working out the way they did". Being the first time he made an animal a major character and the first time he showed one in battle, Araki used Yoshihiro Takahashi's Ginga: Nagareboshi Gin as a reference. He described The Fool as representing his ideal design for a Stand; starting with a dog, then adding a Native American mask, and then the tires of a car. The third aspect was added because Weekly Shōnen Jump was sponsoring a Formula One car at the time.

Having previously done a gambling battle in his manga Cool Shock B.T., Araki wanted to do another as a Stand battle, leading to the creation of D'Arby the Elder. His Stand ability came from the author's own belief that the money and chips you gamble with in real life are a representation of your soul. Having greatly enjoyed the fight, Araki later introduced his younger brother. Looking back, he believes that the D'Arby brothers and the Oingo Boingo brothers separated JoJo's Bizarre Adventure from other manga because it allowed him to add much more variation to its battles. He also said that this led to the dice battle in Diamond Is Unbreakable and the beetle battle in JoJolion.

Enya the Hag was modeled after the scary old women from horror films and created to answer how Dio learned about Stands. Her Stand was also inspired by horror films, where an unknown virus comes from space. Her son's Stand being similar to a mummy and mermaid, again references horror movies. Enya again utilizes what Araki learned from Lisa Lisa in Battle Tendency; the supernatural basis of Stands and Hamon evens the battlefield for women and children to match up against strong men.

Araki recalled how his editor suddenly ended up in the hospital during the serialization of Jotaro and Dio's final fight. Without his valuable advice, the author said it was difficult and he started panicking as the end was approaching.

=== English adaptation ===
Viz Media began publishing an English adaptation of JoJo's Bizarre Adventure in 2005. Skipping Parts 1 and 2, they started with the Stardust Crusaders arc and moved the last chapter of Japanese volume 12 to the beginning of volume 13. This English volume 1 included a recap of Phantom Blood and Battle Tendency in order to clarify story points for Western readers. The English edition of the manga was edited by Jason Thompson, author of Manga: The Complete Guide. Between November 8, 2005, and December 7, 2010, all 16 volumes (corresponding to Japanese volumes 13–28) were published in North America.

Minor edits were made to artwork where certain scenes of animal violence were redrawn by Hirohiko Araki himself. Volume 3 of the English edition features a single panel of a dog being decapitated that was redrawn from an alternate angle, and volume 6 has several redrawn panels where a mutilated dog was changed into a large rat. Mosques in volume 15 were redrawn after international controversy (see below), though this was also in recent Japanese printings. English volume 7 features redrawn artwork in the final chapter of the "Death 13" story arc in order to remove scenes of human feces. Any instances of real-life brand names and logos (such as drinks and automotive brands) were erased. Some character names were altered, presumably for copyright reasons. According to Thompson, the names used in this initial English edition were approved by Araki.

Between 2016 and 2019, Viz Media released Stardust Crusaders in a new deluxe hardcover edition as part of their publication of the entire JoJo's Bizarre Adventure series in the same format as the Japanese JoJonium edition. All changes to the original art were reverted, excluding the aforementioned mosques, but some character names were still changed.

== Chapters ==
In the original volumization, chapter 114 is collected in volume 12, listed on the Battle Tendency page. The original Japanese title is listed first, followed by the title used in the English publication.

=== Original volumization (Jump Comics) / First English release ===
No.	Title	Original release date	English release date
13/1	Dio's Curse / The Evil Spirit; Dio no Jubaku (DIOの呪縛)	December 5, 1989; 978-4-08-851069-9	November 8, 2005; 978-1-59116-754-9
114. "A Man Possessed" (悪霊にとりつかれた男, Akuryō ni Toritsukareta Otoko; lit. 'A Man Possessed by an Evil Spirit') (Note: Chapter 114 is only part of the English volumization.); 115. "The Magician of Fire" (炎の魔術師, Honō no Majutsushi); 116. "The Evil Spirit's Identity!" (悪霊 その正体！, Akuryō Sono Shōtai!); 117. "The Man with the Star" (星のアザをもつ男, Hoshi no Aza o Motsu Otoko; lit. 'The Man with the Star Birthmark'); 118. "The Dreadful Invader" (戦慄の侵入者, Senritsu no Shinnyūsha); 119. "Who Shall Judge?!" (裁くのは誰だ!?, Sabaku no wa Dare da!?); 120. "Dio's Curse" (DIOの呪縛, Dio no Jubaku); 121. "The Stand Warriors" (幽波紋(スタンド)の戦士たち, Sutando no Senshitachi); 122. "The Thing on the Plane" (機中にひそむ魔, Kichū ni Hisomu Ma; lit. 'The Devil Lurking on the Plane'); 123. "Insect Attack!" (奇虫襲撃！, Kimushi Shūgeki!; lit. 'Strange Insect Attack!')
14/2	The Empty Ship and the Ape / Silver Chariot; Mujinsen to Saru (無人船と猿)	February 9, 1990; 978-4-08-851070-5	January 3, 2006; 978-1-59116-850-8
124–126. "Silver Chariot (1–3)" (銀の戦車(シルバーチャリオッツ) その①〜③, Shirubā Chariottsu Sono 1–3); 127–129. "Dark Blue Moon (1–3)" (暗青の月(ダークブルームーン) その①〜③, Dāku Burū Mūn Sono 1–3); 130–132. "Strength (1–3)" (力(ストレングス) その①〜③, Sutorengusu Sono 1–3)
15/3	The Gun Is Mightier Than the Sword / The Emperor and the Hanged Man; Jū wa Ken yori mo Tsuyoshi (銃は剣よりも強し)	April 10, 1990; 978-4-08-851215-0	March 7, 2006; 978-1-4215-0336-3
133–135. "The Devil (1–3)" (悪魔(デビル) その①〜③, Debiru Sono 1–3); 136–139. "Yellow Temperance (1–4)" (黄の節制(イエローテンパランス) その①〜④, Ierō Tenparansu Sono 1–4); 140–142. "The Emperor and the Hanged Man (1–3)" (皇帝(エンペラー)と吊られた男(ハングドマン) その①〜③, Enperā to Hangudo Man Sono 1–3)
16/4	Battle Experience! / Terror in India; Tatakai no Nenki! (戦いの年季!)	June 8, 1990; 978-4-08-851216-7	June 6, 2006; 978-1-4215-0653-1
143–145. "The Emperor and the Hanged Man (4–6)" (皇帝(エンペラー)と吊られた男(ハングドマン) その④〜⑥, Enperā to Hangudo Man Sono 4–6); 146–149. "The Empress (1–4)" (女帝(エンプレス) その①〜④, Enpuresu Sono 1–4); 150–152. "Wheel of Fortune (1–3)" (運命の車輪(ホウィール・オブ・フォーチュン) その①〜③, Howīru Obu Fōchun Sono 1–3)
17/5	The Terrifying Lovers / City of Death; Osoroshiki Rabāzu (恐ろしき恋人(ラバーズ))	August 8, 1990; 978-4-08-851217-4	September 5, 2006; 978-1-4215-0654-8
153. "Wheel of Fortune (4)" (運命の車輪(ホウィール・オブ・フォーチュン) その④, Howīru Obu Fōchun Sono 4); 154–159. "Justice (1–6)" (正義(ジャスティス) その①〜⑥, Jasutisu Sono 1–6); 160–162. "The Lovers (1–3)" (恋人(ラバーズ) その①〜③, Rabāzu Sono 1–3)
18/6	Death 13 of Dreams / The Arabian Nightmare; Yume no Desu Sātīn (夢のDEATH(デス)13(サーティーン))	October 8, 1990; 978-4-08-851218-1	December 5, 2006; 978-1-4215-0655-5
163–165. "The Lovers (4–6)" (恋人(ラバーズ) その④〜⑥, Rabāzu Sono 4–6); 166–167. "The Sun (1–2)" (太陽 その①〜②, Taiyō Sono 1–2); 168–171. "Death 13 (1–4)" (死神13(デスサーティーン) その①〜④, Desu Sātīn Sono 1–4)
19/7	The Magic Lamp / The Three Wishes; Mahō no Ranpu (魔法のランプ)	December 4, 1990; 978-4-08-851219-8	April 3, 2007; 978-1-4215-1078-1
172–173. "Death 13 (5–6)" (死神13(デスサーティーン) その⑤〜⑥, Desu Sātīn Sono 5–6); 174–178. "Judgement (1–5)" (審判(ジャッジメント) その①〜⑤, Jajjimento Sono 1–5); 179–181. "The High Priestess (1–3)" (女教皇(ハイプリエステス) その①〜③, Hai Puriesutesu Sono 1–3)
20/8	The Exploding Orange / Iggy the Fool and the God Geb (Note: Although the back cover of the English release uses the title Iggy the Fool and the Great God Geb, the title page and the titles of the titular chapters leave out the word "Great."); Bakudan-jikake no Orenji (爆弾仕かけのオレンジ)	February 8, 1991; 978-4-08-851220-4	August 7, 2007; 978-1-4215-1079-8
182. "The High Priestess (4)" (女教皇(ハイプリエステス) その④, Hai Puriesutesu Sono 4); 183–188. "Iggy 'The Fool' and 'Geb' N'Doul (1–6)" (「愚者(ザ・フール)」のイギーと「ゲブ神」のンドゥール その①〜⑥, "Za Fūru" no Igī to Gebu-shin no Ndūru Sono 1–6); 189–191. "'Khnum' Oingo and 'Thoth' Boingo (1–3)" (「クヌム神」のオインゴと「トト神」のボインゴ その①〜③, "Kunumu-shin" no Oingo to "Toto-shin" no Boingo Sono 1–3)
21/9	A Woman with Wonderful Legs / The Deadly Sword; Ashi ga Gunbatsu no Onna (脚がグンバツの女)	May 10, 1991; 978-4-08-851564-9	December 4, 2007; 978-1-4215-1080-4
192. "'Khnum' Oingo and 'Thoth' Boingo (4)" (「クヌム神」のオインゴと「トト神」のボインゴ その④, "Kunumu-shin" no Oingo to "Toto-shin" no Boingo Sono 4); 193–198. "Anubis (1–6)" (「アヌビス神」 その①〜⑥, "Anubisu-shin" Sono 1–6); 199–201. "'Bastet' Mariah (1–3)" (「バステト女神」のマライア その①〜③, "Basuteto-joshin" no Maraia Sono 1–3)
22/10	Disappearance in a Locked Room / The Shadow of Set; Misshitsu de Shōshitsu (密室で消失)	July 10, 1991; 978-4-08-851565-6	April 1, 2008; 978-1-4215-1081-1
202–204. "'Bastet' Mariah (4–6)" (「バステト女神」のマライア その④〜⑥, "Basuteto-joshin" no Maraia Sono 4–6); 205–209. "'Set' Alessi (1–5)" (「セト神」のアレッシー その①〜⑤, "Seto-shin" no Aresshī Sono 1–5); 210. "The Man Who Shot Dio" (DIOを撃つ!?, Dio o Utsu!?; lit. 'Shooting Dio?!')
23/11	D'Arby's Collection / D'Arby the Gambler; Dābīzu Korekushon (ダービーズコレクション)	September 10, 1991; 978-4-08-851566-3	April 7, 2009; 978-1-4215-1632-5
211–216. "D'Arby the Gambler (1–6)" (ダービー・ザ・ギャンブラー その①〜⑥, Dābī za Gyanburā Sono 1–6); 217–219. "Hol Horse and Boingo (1–3)" (ホル・ホースとボインゴ その①〜③, Horu Hōsu to Boingo Sono 1–3)
24/12	Pet Shop, the Gatekeeper of Hell / The Claws of Horus; Jigoku no Monban Petto Shoppu (地獄の門番ペット・ショップ)	November 8, 1991; 978-4-08-851567-0	August 4, 2009; 978-1-4215-1633-2
220–221. "Hol Horse and Boingo (4–5)" (ホル・ホースとボインゴ その④〜⑤, Horu Hōsu to Boingo Sono 4–5); 222–226. "Pet Shop, the Gatekeeper of Hell (1–5)" (地獄の門番ペット・ショップ その①〜⑤, Jigoku no Monban Petto Shoppu Sono 1–5); 227–228. "D'Arby the Player (1–2)" (ダービー・ザ・プレイヤー その①〜②, Dābī za Pureiyā Sono 1–2)
25/13	D'Arby the Player; Dābī za Pureiyā (ダービー・ザ・プレイヤー)	February 10, 1992; 978-4-08-851568-7	December 1, 2009; 978-1-4215-2406-1
229–237. "D'Arby the Player (3–11)" (ダービー・ザ・プレイヤー その③〜⑪, Dābī za Pureiyā Sono 3–11)
26/14	The Miasma of the Void, Vanilla Ice / Showdown; Akū no Shōki Vanira Aisu (亜空の瘴気 ヴァニラ・アイス)	April 10, 1992; 978-4-08-851569-4	April 6, 2010; 978-1-4215-2407-8
238–245. "The Dark Void of Vanilla Ice (1–8)" (亜空の瘴気 ヴァニラ・アイス その①〜⑧, Akū no Shōki Vanira Aisu Sono 1–8; lit. 'The Miasma of the Void, Vanilla Ice (1–8)'); 246. "Suzi Q Joestar Visits Her Daughter" (スージー・Q・ジョースター 娘に会いにくる, Sūjī Kyū Jōsutā Musume ni Ai ni Kuru)
27/15	Dio's World; Dio no Sekai (DIOの世界)	June 10, 1992; 978-4-08-851570-0	August 3, 2010; 978-1-4215-2408-5
247–256. "Dio's World (1–10)" (DIOの世界 その①〜⑩, Dio no Sekai Sono 1–10)
28/16	The Faraway Journey, Farewell Friends / Journey's End; Haruka naru Tabiji Saraba Tomo yo (遥かなる旅路 さらば友よ)	August 4, 1992; 978-4-08-851634-9	December 7, 2010; 978-1-4215-3084-0
257–264. "Dio's World (11–18)" (DIOの世界 その⑪〜⑱, Dio no Sekai Sono 11–18); 265. "The Faraway Journey, Farewell Friends" (遥かなる旅路 さらば友よ, Haruka naru Tabiji Saraba Tomo yo)

=== 2002 release (Shueisha Bunko) ===
No.	Title	Japanese release date	Japanese ISBN
8	Part 3: Stardust Crusaders 1 Part 3 Sutādasuto Kuruseidāsu 1 (Part3 スターダストクルセイダース1)	June 18, 2002	4-08-617791-9
114–116. "Jotaro Kujo (1–3)" (空条承太郎 その①〜③, Kūjō Jōtarō Sono 1–3); 117. "The Man with the Star" (星のアザをもつ男, Hoshi no Aza o Motsu Otoko; lit. 'The Man with the Star Birthmark'); 118–120. "Noriaki Kakyoin (1–3)" (花京院典明 その①〜③, Kakyōin Noriaki Sono 1–3); 121. "The Power Called a 'Stand'" (「スタンド」という力, "Sutando" to Iu Chikara); 122. "Head to Egypt" (エジプトへ向かえ, Ejiputo e Mukae); 123. "Tower of Gray" (灰の塔(タワー・オブ・グレー), Tawā Obu Gurē); 124–126. "Silver Chariot (1–3)" (銀の戦車(シルバーチャリオッツ) その①〜③, Shirubā Chariottsu Sono 1–3); 127–128. "Dark Blue Moon (1–2)" (暗青の月(ダークブルームーン) その①〜②, Dāku Burū Mūn Sono 1–2)
9	Part 3: Stardust Crusaders 2 Part 3 Sutādasuto Kuruseidāsu 2 (Part3 スターダストクルセイダース2)	June 18, 2002	4-08-617792-7
Chapters 129–143
10	Part 3: Stardust Crusaders 3 Part 3 Sutādasuto Kuruseidāsu 3 (Part3 スターダストクルセイダース3)	July 18, 2002	4-08-617793-5
Chapters 144–158
11	Part 3: Stardust Crusaders 4 Part 3 Sutādasuto Kuruseidāsu 4 (Part3 スターダストクルセイダース4)	July 18, 2002	4-08-617794-3
Chapters 159–173
12	Part 3: Stardust Crusaders 5 Part 3 Sutādasuto Kuruseidāsu 5 (Part3 スターダストクルセイダース5)	August 9, 2002	4-08-617795-1
Chapters 174–188
13	Part 3: Stardust Crusaders 6 Part 3 Sutādasuto Kuruseidāsu 6 (Part3 スターダストクルセイダース6)	August 9, 2002	4-08-617796-X
Chapters 189–204
14	Part 3: Stardust Crusaders 7 Part 3 Sutādasuto Kuruseidāsu 7 (Part3 スターダストクルセイダース7)	September 18, 2002	4-08-617797-8
Chapters 205–219
15	Part 3: Stardust Crusaders 8 Part 3 Sutādasuto Kuruseidāsu 8 (Part3 スターダストクルセイダース8)	September 18, 2002	4-08-617798-6
Chapters 220–234
16	Part 3: Stardust Crusaders 9 Part 3 Sutādasuto Kuruseidāsu 9 (Part3 スターダストクルセイダース9)	October 18, 2002	4-08-617799-4
Chapters 235–250
17	Part 3: Stardust Crusaders 10; Part 3 Sutādasuto Kuruseidāsu 10 (Part3 スターダストクルセイダース10)	October 18, 2002	4-08-617800-1
Chapters 251–265

=== 2013 release (Shueisha Manga Soshuhen) ===
No.	Title	Japanese release date	Japanese ISBN
1 (4)	Part 3: Stardust Crusaders Digest Edition Vol. 1 Dai San Bu Sutādasuto Kuruseidāsu Sōshūhen Vuoryūmu 1 (第3部 スターダストクルセイダース 総集編 Vol．1)	July 5, 2013	978-4-08-111062-9
2 (5)	Part 3: Stardust Crusaders Digest Edition Vol. 2 Dai San Bu Sutādasuto Kuruseidāsu Sōshūhen Vuoryūmu 2 (第3部 スターダストクルセイダース 総集編 Vol．2)	August 2, 2013	978-4-08-111063-6
3 (6)	Part 3: Stardust Crusaders Digest Edition Vol. 3 Dai San Bu Sutādasuto Kuruseidāsu Sōshūhen Vuoryūmu 3 (第3部 スターダストクルセイダース 総集編 Vol．3)	September 6, 2013	978-4-08-111064-3
4 (7)	Part 3: Stardust Crusaders Digest Edition Vol. 4 Dai San Bu Sutādasuto Kuruseidāsu Sōshūhen Vuoryūmu 4 (第3部 スターダストクルセイダース 総集編 Vol．4)	October 4, 2013	978-4-08-111065-0
5 (8)	Part 3: Stardust Crusaders Digest Edition Vol. 5 Dai San Bu Sutādasuto Kuruseidāsu Sōshūhen Vuoryūmu 5 (第3部 スターダストクルセイダース 総集編 Vol．5)	November 1, 2013	978-4-08-111066-7

=== 2014 release (JoJonium) / Second English release ===
No.	Title	Original release date	English release date
1 (8)	Part 3: Stardust Crusaders 01; JoJonium 8	June 4, 2014; 978-4-08-782839-9	November 1, 2016; 978-1-4215-9065-3
Chapters 1–13
2 (9)	Part 3: Stardust Crusaders 02; JoJonium 9	July 4, 2014; 978-4-08-782840-5	February 7, 2017; 978-1-4215-9157-5
Chapters 14–26
3 (10)	Part 3: Stardust Crusaders 03; JoJonium 10	August 5, 2014; 978-4-08-782841-2	May 2, 2017; 978-1-4215-9169-8
Chapters 27–40
4 (11)	Part 3: Stardust Crusaders 04; JoJonium 11	September 4, 2014; 978-4-08-782842-9	August 1, 2017; 978-1-4215-9170-4
Chapters 41–54
5 (12)	Part 3: Stardust Crusaders 05; JoJonium 12	October 3, 2014; 978-4-08-782843-6	November 7, 2017; 978-1-4215-9171-1
Chapters 55–69
6 (13)	Part 3: Stardust Crusaders 06; JoJonium 13	November 4, 2014; 978-4-08-782844-3	February 6, 2018; 978-1-4215-9172-8
Chapters 70–85
7 (14)	Part 3: Stardust Crusaders 07; JoJonium 14	December 4, 2014; 978-4-08-782845-0	May 1, 2018; 978-1-4215-9173-5
Chapters 86–103
8 (15)	Part 3: Stardust Crusaders 08; JoJonium 15	December 26, 2014; 978-4-08-782846-7	August 7, 2018; 978-1-4215-9174-2
Chapters 104–114
9 (16)	Part 3: Stardust Crusaders 09; JoJonium 16	February 4, 2015; 978-4-08-782847-4	November 6, 2018; 978-1-4215-9175-9
Chapters 115–133
10 (17)	Part 3: Stardust Crusaders 10; JoJonium 17	March 4, 2015; 978-4-08-782848-1	February 5, 2019; 978-1-4215-9176-6
Chapters 134–152

== Related media ==
From 1992 to 1993, Stardust Crusaders was adapted into the three-volume audio drama JoJo's Bizarre Adventure, subtitled Jotaro Kujo's Visitation, (Note: Jotaro Kujo's Visitation (空条承太郎見参の巻, Kūjō Jōtarō Kenzan no Maki)) The Death of Avdol, (Note: The Death of Avdol (アヴドゥル死すの巻, Avuduru Shisu no Maki)) and Dio's World. (Note: Dio's World (DIOの世界の巻, Dio no Sekai no Maki)) Two light novels illustrated by Araki have been released. The first is titled JoJo's Bizarre Adventure, released on November 4, 1993, and written by Mayori Sekijima and Hiroshi Yamaguchi. Nisio Isin was one of the authors commissioned to write novels in celebration of the series' 25th anniversary. It was released on December 16, 2011, and titled JoJo's Bizarre Adventure Over Heaven.

A 13-episode OVA series, JoJo's Bizarre Adventure, was produced by Studio APPP. The first six episodes were released on VHS and Laserdisc by Pony Canyon from 1993 to 1994, covering the latter part of this arc. When the series was released on DVD by Klock Worx from 2000 to 2002, an additional set of seven episodes were produced by the same cast and crew, serving as a prequel to the earlier episodes (which were subsequently re-released with new chronological numbering). Super Techno Arts produced a North American English dub version of all 13 episodes in chronological order as a six-volume DVD series.

An anime television adaptation of the series, titled JoJo's Bizarre Adventure: Stardust Crusaders, was produced by David Production and aired in Japan between April 2014 and June 2015. The series was simulcast by Crunchyroll, with several names rewritten to avoid copyright infringement. In addition to the second season of the anime, a mobile app game titled JoJo's Bizarre Adventure: Stardust Shooters was also released.

The arc has been adapted into several video games. The first was a role-playing video game released in 1993 for the Super Famicom under the title of JoJo's Bizarre Adventure. A fighting game for arcades by Capcom, also simply titled JoJo's Bizarre Adventure, was released in 1998. It was released internationally as JoJo's Venture, and followed by an upgraded version titled JoJo's Bizarre Adventure: Heritage for the Future. The international version this time retained the manga's actual full title of JoJo's Bizarre Adventure, dropping the Heritage for the Future subtitle. The upgraded version was then ported to the PlayStation and Dreamcast in 1999, and a high-definition version was released for PlayStation Network and Xbox Live Arcade in August 2012 before being delisted in 2014. Several characters from Stardust Crusaders later appear in the crossover games JoJo's Bizarre Adventure: All Star Battle and JoJo's Bizarre Adventure: Eyes of Heaven, both published by Bandai Namco Entertainment and developed by CyberConnect2. Jotaro and Dio in particular also appear in several crossover games with other Weekly Shōnen Jump characters, such as in Jump Super Stars, Jump Ultimate Stars and most recently Jump Force.

== Controversy ==
In May 2008, both Shueisha and Studio APPP halted manga/OVA shipments of JoJo after a complaint had been launched against them by a group of online Muslim protestors after a scene from one of the OVA's episodes features Dio reading a book depicting pages from the Qur'an. This recall affected the English-language releases as well, causing Viz Media and Shueisha to cease publication for a year. Even though the manga did not feature that specific scene, Shueisha had Araki redraw scenes that depicted characters fighting on-top, and destroying, mosques. Viz resumed publication a year later, with the eleventh volume being published on April 7, 2009, and thus their publication was continued.

== Reception ==
In a 2018 survey of 17,000 JoJo's Bizarre Adventure fans, Stardust Crusaders was chosen as the third favorite story arc with 17.3% of the vote. Its battle between Jotaro and Dio was chosen as the favorite fight of the series.

Reviewing Stardust Crusaders for Anime News Network, Rebecca Silverman enjoyed seeing Part 2's Joseph team up with new protagonist Jotaro and was impressed that Araki was able to keep Dio out of Part 2 completely, only to bring him back for Part 3. She initially called the replacement of Hamon with Stands both understandable and a bit of a disappointment, since the "insane physical abilities and contortions" caused by the former were a large source of the fun in the first two parts. However, Silverman would go on to describe later Stand battles as exciting and creative in subsequent reviews.
