= Brannigan =

Brannigan may refer to:

== Brannigan ==
=== Films ===
- Brannigan (film), a 1975 film starring John Wayne

=== People ===
- Francis Brannigan (1918–2006), fire service construction educator
- Geraldine Brannigan, (born 1954), Irish singer

=== Fictional characters ===
- Zapp Brannigan, a character in Futurama

=== Food ===
- Brannigans, a brand of crisps

== Branigan ==
=== People ===
- Alan Branigan, Ivorian-born American soccer player
- Andy Branigan (1922–1995), Canadian ice-hockey player
- Darlene Brannigan Smith, American academic administrator
- James Christopher Branigan (1910–1986), a member of the Garda Síochána (Irish Police Force)
- Laura Branigan (1952–2004), American singer
  - Branigan (album), debut album by Branigan in 1982
- Sir Patrick Branigan (1906–2000), Irish-born barrister and colonial administrator

=== Places ===
- Branigan Lake, a lake in California
- "Branigan", nickname of the Thomas Branigan Memorial Library

== See also ==
- Branagan
