= Joline =

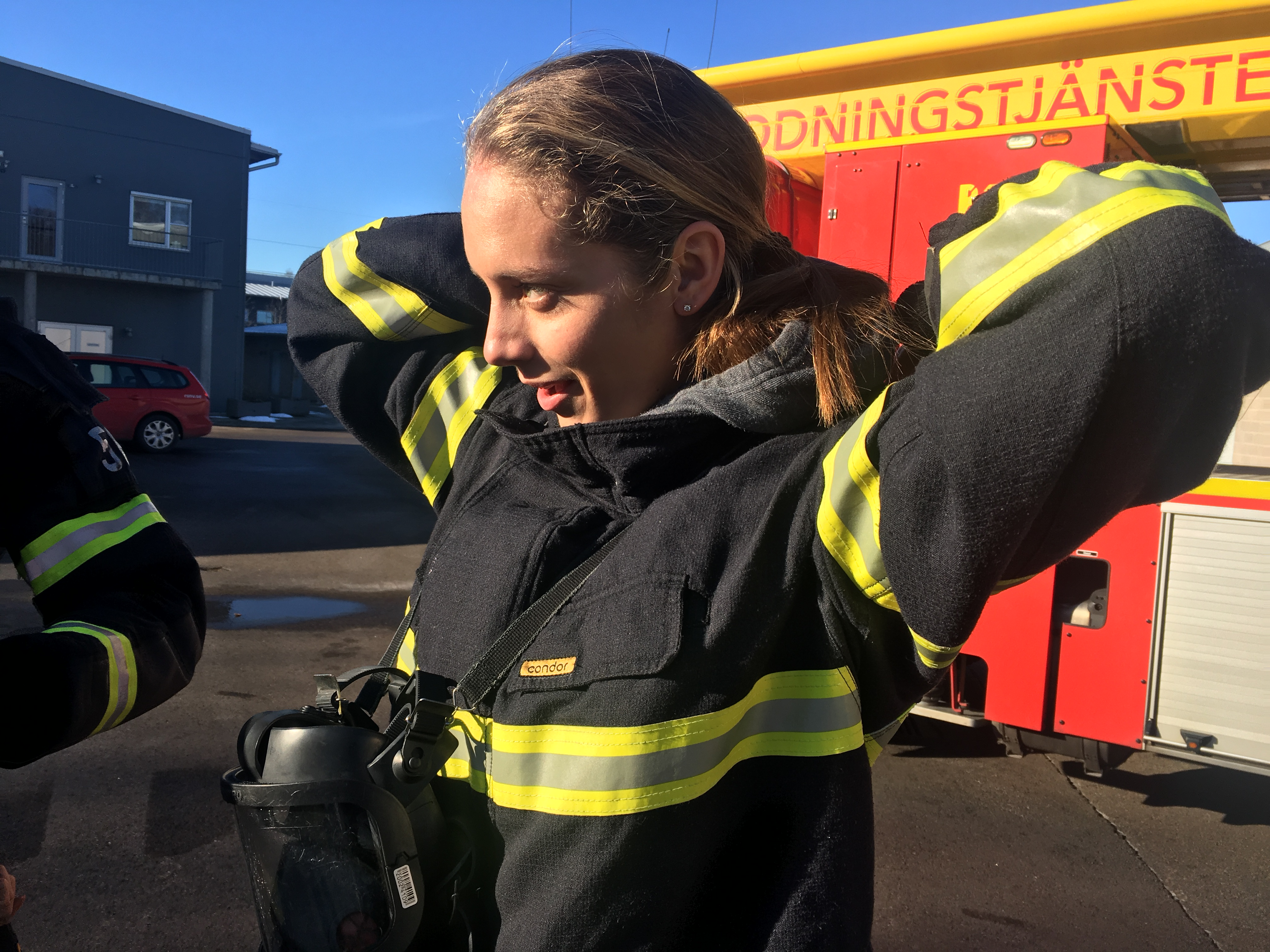
Joline Höstman

Joline is a given name. Notable people with the name include:

- Joline Beam, American politician
- Joline Blais (born 1960), American writer, educator, and designer
- Joline Godfrey (born 1950), American businesswoman
- Joline Henry (born 1982), American netball player
- Joline Höstman (born 1988), Swedish swimmer

== See also ==
- Jolene (disambiguation)
