= Darlene (given name) =

- Pronunciation: dar-LEAN
- Gender: Female

Origin
- Origin: English
- Meaning: darling

Other names
- Related names: Darla

Darlene, also spelled Darleen or Darline, is an English feminine given name coined in the late 19th century. It is based on the term of endearment darling in combination with the diminutive suffix -een, -ene, or -ine in use in other names popular during that period such as Arleen, Charlene, Claudine, Irene, Jolene, Josephine, Marlene, Maxine, and Pauline. The greatest use of the name has been in North America. Darla is a variant.

== Usage ==
The name first appeared on the list of 1,000 most used names for newborn girls in the United States in 1909 and remained among the top 1,000 names there until 2004, after which it declined in use. It was at the height of popularity between 1933 and 1966, when it was among the 100 most used names for American girls. There were 107 newborn American girls who were given the name Darlene in 2022. It was among the top 100 names for newborn girls in Canada between 1943 and 1973. It was among the top 1,000 names for newborn girls in Brazil between 1950 and 2000.

== Notable people ==
- Darlene (formerly known as Darlene Pekul) (born 1954), American artist and calligrapher
- Darlene Ferrin, American murder victim of the Zodiac Killer
- Darlene Berberabe (born 1967), Filipino lawyer, academic, and corporate executive
- Darlene Caamaño (born 1970), American film producer
- Darlene Cates (1947–2017), American actress
- Darlene Conley (1934–2007), American actress
- Darlene de Souza (born 1990), Brazilian footballer
- Darlene Fairley (born 1943), American politician
- Darlene Gillespie (born 1941), Canadian-American actress
- Darlene Garner, American minister and activist
- Darlene Hard (1936–2021), American tennis player
- Darlene Hill (born 1989), American artistic gymnast
- Darlene Clark Hine (born 1947), American author and professor
- Darlene Hooley (born 1939), American politician
- Darlene Hunt (born 1970), American actress
- Darlene Koldenhoven, American vocalist, pianist, composer, and author
- Darlene Lim, Canadian NASA geobiologist and exobiologist
- Darlene Love (born 1941), American singer and actress
- Darlene McCoy (born 1971), American singer, songwriter, author, and radio personality
- Darlene Naponse, Canadian Anishinaabe filmmaker, writer, director, and community activist
- Darlene Ka-Mook Nichols (born 1955), Native American activist and FBI informant
- Darlene Pagano, American lesbian feminist activist
- Darlene Quaife (born 1948), Canadian novelist
- Darlene Rodriguez (born 1970), American journalist
- Darlene Rose, American missionary
- Darlene Rotchford, Canadian politician
- Darlene Brannigan Smith, American academic administrator
- Darlene Tompkins (1940–2019), American actress
- Darlene Vogel (born 1962), American actress and model
- Darlene Zschech (born 1965), Australian religious leader and musician

== In fiction ==
- Darlene Campbell is a fictional character from the American film series, Final Destination
- Darlene Conner is a fictional character from the television sitcom Roseanne
- Darlene is one of the characters in the play and film Hurlyburly
- Darlene Snell is a main character from the American crime drama television series, Ozark
- Darlene Spritzer is a fictional waitress from the DC Comics Lobo comic books
- Darlene Taylor is a fictional character from the soap opera Hollyoaks
- Darlene Alderson is one of the characters from the television series Mr. Robot
