= Nail fetish =

Nail fetish may refer to:

- Nkondi, wooden religious idols made by the Kongo people of the Congo region, which have nails hammered into them
- Hand fetishism, a sexual fascination with hands
- Foot fetishism, a sexual fascination with feet
