= Diamond Is Unbreakable =

Fourth story arc of JoJo's Bizarre Adventure

- JoJo's Bizarre Adventure volume 36 cover, featuring Josuke (center), and (clockwise from top left) Okuyasu, Jotaro, Koichi, and Rohan

ダイヤモンドは砕けない (Daiyamondo wa Kudakenai)
- Genre: Adventure, supernatural
- Manga
- Written by: Hirohiko Araki
- Published by: Shueisha
- English publisher: NA: Viz Media
- Imprint: Jump Comics
- Magazine: Weekly Shōnen Jump
- Original run: May 4, 1992 – December 4, 1995
- Volumes: 18
- Other media
- Animated TV series (2016); Live-action film (2017); Crazy Diamond's Demonic Heartbreak (2021)
- Chronology
- Preceded by: Stardust Crusaders; Followed by: Golden Wind
- icon

Diamond Is Unbreakable (Japanese: ダイヤモンドは砕けない, Hepburn: Daiyamondo wa Kudakenai; sometimes translated as Diamond Is Not Crash) is the fourth main story arc of the Japanese manga series JoJo's Bizarre Adventure, written and illustrated by Hirohiko Araki. It was serialized in Shueisha's Weekly Shōnen Jump for a little more than 3 1/2 years, from May 4, 1992, to December 4, 1995, with the 174 chapters collected into eighteen tankōbon volumes. In its original publication, it was titled JoJo's Bizarre Adventure Part 4: Jōsuke Higashikata (ジョジョの奇妙な冒険 第4部 東方仗助, JoJo no Kimyō na Bōken Dai Yon Bu: Higashikata Jōsuke). It was preceded by Stardust Crusaders and followed by Golden Wind.

This part introduces the Stand Arrow, which causes anyone pierced by it to develop a Stand if they are mentally strong enough. The Arrow was retroactively revealed to be the source of Dio's stand as well as the Joestar family's stands. The arc was adapted into an anime television series by David Production, JoJo's Bizarre Adventure: Diamond Is Unbreakable, that began in April 2016. A live-action film adaptation by Toho and Warner Bros. titled JoJo's Bizarre Adventure: Diamond Is Unbreakable Chapter I was released on August 4, 2017. Viz Media released the manga in English in a nine-volume edition from 2019 to 2021.

== Plot ==
In 1999, Jotaro Kujo arrives to the town of Morioh (杜王町, Moriō-chō) in the M-Prefecture (M県, Emu-ken) after learning that his grandfather Joseph Joestar has an illegitimate son while compiling a list of beneficiaries. He bumps into a freshman named Koichi Hirose before the two encounter the youth Jotaro is looking for: A highschool student named Josuke Higashikata, (Note: Josuke Higashikata (東方 仗助, Higashikata Jōsuke; the kanji 助 suke can also be read as jo)) whose Stand Crazy Diamond allows him to manipulate matter in ways that include repairing and healing. Fighting Josuke after inadvertently insulting his pompadour, Jotaro explains the nature of Stands and that one is being used by a death row inmate named Anjuro "Angelo" Katagiri, who escaped to Morioh. Josuke unknowingly makes an enemy of Angelo, who murders his grandfather before Josuke uses his power to fuse Angelo into a rock. However, Angelo uses his final moments of consciousness to reveal someone hit him with an Arrow that gave him his Stand, Jotaro learning that an actual artifact was possessed by Dio's forces. Josuke and Koichi eventually come across the culprit, Keicho Nijimura, who inflicts Koichi with the Arrow while his younger brother Okuyasu holds Josuke off. Josuke defeats Okuyasu and heals Koichi with Crazy Diamond, with Koichi developing a Stand called Echoes. After Keicho is defeated with his reason of creating Stand users to create someone able to mercy kill his father, a mutated subordinate of Dio's, Keicho is killed by Stand Red Hot Chili Pepper, which takes the Bow and Arrow. Okuyasu then joins Josuke's group to avenge his brother, encountering several other Stand users Keicho created before they eventually find and defeat Akira Otoishi, Red Hot Chili Pepper's user, as Joseph arrives in Morioh. The Bow and Arrow are taken into Jotaro's custody and all seems to be over for the moment.

Soon afterward, after Josuke tries spending time with Joseph as they find a baby with an invisibility stand, the group encounters other Stand users such as eccentric manga artist Rohan Kishibe, middle schooler Shigekiyo "Shigechi" Yangu, and a beautician named Aya Tsuji. Koichi and Rohan later meet the ghosts of Reimi Sugimoto and her dog Arnold after stumbling into the mysterious Ghost Alley, learning of a serial killer who has been lurking in Morioh for years. The murderer is a handsome office worker named Yoshikage Kira, who seeks to satisfy his murderous hand fetish obsession while living a peaceful, quiet life by using the destructive ability of his Stand, Killer Queen, to erase any evidence of his crimes. But his prompted murder of Shigechi ends up exposing him during a brief battle with Jotaro and Koichi that left him injured as Josuke and Okuyasu arrive. Kira escapes and forces Aya to use her Stand to swap identities with a man Kosaku Kawajiri, killing them both while assuming Kosaku's life. Kira's father Yoshihiro, a ghost who uses his Stand to live on in a photo, uses a Bow and Arrow he received years ago from Enya Geil to create an army of Stand users to protect his son, including a dying cat that reincarnated as a Stand-plant hybrid named Stray Cat which Kira took as a pet.

Kosaku's son Hayato Kawajiri begins to suspect his father's imposter and confronts Kira, only to get murdered with Kira panicking before receiving a new ability after pierced by Yoshihiro's Arrow a second time that allows him to revive Hayato. The following morning, Hayato learns Kira inflicted him with Killer Queen's new ability Bites the Dust, which destroys whoever Hayato reveals Kira's identity to while rewinding time back an hour with the victim's fate fixed. After Rohan died in one loop and Josuke's group the next, Hayato realizes he needs to force Kira into canceling Bites the Dust before the others are killed with their deaths made permanent. Hayato exploits the knowledge he gained from the time loop to wake Josuke up early and arrange for him to overhear Kira blowing his cover. Kira is forced to use Killer Queen to defend himself, which cancels Bites the Dust just in time to save Josuke and his allies.

Josuke engages Kira in a pitched battle, Okuyasu seemingly killed as Josuke and Hayato take refuge in a house when Kira combines his Stand's powers with Stray Cat to create invisible projectile bombs. Kira plants Yoshihiro's photo into Hayato's pocket to track Josuke, only to be tricked into destroying his father before Okuyasu appears in the nick of time to swipe Stray Cat and further disadvantage Kira. As Jotaro, Koichi, and Rohan arrive with emergency workers responding to the explosions, Kira attempts to activate Bites the Dust on a nearby paramedic in a last ditch attempt to avert his defeat. But he is stopped by Jotaro with assistance from Koichi, knocked into the path of an arriving ambulance that accidentally crushes his skull. Kira's ghost ends up in Ghost Alley and is confronted by Reimi, who gets him dragged off into an unknown fate by spectral hands. Her mission accomplished, Reimi gives the group her final farewells and moves on to the afterlife. The next day, Josuke bids farewell to Jotaro and Joseph, who leave Morioh as the summer of 1999 draws to a close.

== Characters ==
- Josuke Higashikata (Note: Josuke Higashikata (東方 仗助, Higashikata Jōsuke)) is the illegitimate son of Joseph Joestar. He is a freshman who lives in the town of Morioh with his mother and grandfather. His Stand is Crazy Diamond, (Note: Crazy Diamond (クレイジー・ダイヤモンド, Kureijī Daiyamondo; "Shining Diamond" in English versions)) which can not only punch rapidly, but also restore objects to their original state or rearrange their structure, allowing him to heal injuries, erase written documents, or revert complex structures to their raw components. However, Crazy Diamond has no effect when used on Josuke himself. Despite normally being kind and friendly, Josuke becomes especially enraged if anyone insults his pompadour hairstyle, which he adopted after a delinquent with the hairstyle saved him and his mother during a blizzard. This is demonstrated for the first time after he punches an upperclassman and incorrectly heals his face for insulting his hair.
- Koichi Hirose (Note: Koichi Hirose (広瀬 康一, Hirose Kōichi)) is Josuke's and Okuyasu's best friend and is also a freshman in high school, but appears as a short boy. His Stand is Echoes, (Note: Echoes (エコーズ, Ekōzu; "Reverb" in English versions)) which has three distinct "ACTs". ACT1 can create messages and attach them to a person by touching them, which results in the message repeatedly played in the victim's head (e.g. attaching the phrase "Believe in me" causes the message to be audibly spoken in Koichi's mother's head), ACT2 has a similar ability but instead can attach onomatopoeia onto objects, causing the effect of the onomatopoeia to activate when touched (e.g. attaching "sizzle" to a stair railing causes it to burn the person when touched), while ACT3 loses the former abilities (but can still recall previous ACTs) and sacrifices its long range, it gains the ability "3-Freeze", which dramatically increases the weight of a target and thereby making it unable to move. Koichi gains access to each ACT as he grows throughout the story, ultimately gaining ACT3 in the first battle with Kira.
- Okuyasu Nijimura (Note: Okuyasu Nijimura (虹村 億泰, Nijimura Okuyasu)) is one of the two Nijimura brothers who became friends with Josuke Higashikata and Koichi Hirose after encountering a Stand user who murdered his brother. His Stand is The Hand, (Note: The Hand (ザ・ハンド, Za Hando)) which can erase whatever it swipes with its right hand and can even be used to erase space, drawing objects closer to Okuyasu. Though the ability is incredibly versatile and powerful, Okuyasu's subpar intelligence prevents him from using it to its fullest potential.
- Jotaro Kujo (Note: Jotaro Kujo (空条 承太郎, Kūjō Jōtarō)) is an aspiring marine biologist who travels to Morioh to find his grandfather's illegitimate son, Josuke Higashikata, who is technically Jotaro's uncle despite Jotaro being older than him, as well as investigate the crimes of a Stand user. His Stand is Star Platinum, (Note: Star Platinum (星の白金(スタープラチナ), Sutā Purachina)) which compensates for its short range with incredible strength, speed, and precision, as well as the ability Star Platinum: The World, (Note: Star Platinum: The World (スタープラチナ ザ・ワールド, Sutā Purachina Za Wārudo)) which lets Jotaro temporarily stop the flow of time.
- Joseph Joestar (Note: Joseph Joestar (ジョセフ・ジョースター, Josefu Jōsutā)) is Josuke's father and Jotaro's grandfather. His Stand is Hermit Purple, (Note: Hermit Purple (隠者の紫(ハーミットパープル), Hāmitto Pāpuru)) which manifests in the form of multipurpose thorny purple vines that allow him to divine information through electrical equipment or be utilized as ropes. Now in his late 70's, Joseph is incredibly feeble and senile.
- Rohan Kishibe (Note: Rohan Kishibe (岸辺 露伴, Kishibe Rohan)) is a famous manga artist who recently moved to Morioh. His Stand, Heaven's Door, (Note: Heaven's Door (ヘブンズ・ドアー, Hebunzu Doā)) allows him to temporarily turn a person into a book, with all of their memories written down akin to a novel. Rohan can read the memories, learn their weaknesses and secrets, as well as write down commands that they must follow (usually writing that enemies cannot attack him). The power typically activates when the target sees Rohan's drawn artwork, but can also activate if Rohan draws something in the air with his finger. Rohan also stars in his own spin-off one-shot series by Araki called Thus Spoke Kishibe Rohan.
- Keicho Nijimura (Note: Keicho Nijimura (虹村 形兆, Nijimura Keichō)) is Okuyasu's elder brother who caused the outbreak of Stand users in Morioh to create one whose Stand can end the suffering of their father after he was mutated by Dio Brando into a monstrous being with rapid regeneration. Keicho was later killed by Akira Otoishi when saving his brother from an attack by the guitarist's stand. Keicho's Stand, Bad Company, (Note: Bad Company (バッド・カンパニー, Baddo Kanpanī; "Worse Company" in English versions)) is an army of toy soldiers.
- Anjuro Katagiri, (Note: Anjuro Katagiri (片桐 安十郎, Katagiri Anjūrō)) also known as "Angelo", (Note: Angelo (アンジェロ, Anjero)) is a depraved serial killer with an IQ of 160. Originally on death row for various acts of murder and sexual assault, including staging a post-mortem ransom for a young boy, Angelo is made a Stand User by Keicho and uses his water-based Stand Aqua Necklace (Note: Aqua Necklace (アクア・ネックレス, Akua Nekkuresu)) to escape captivity and resume his killing spree in Morioh before ultimately confronting Josuke, murdering the youth's grandfather before being fused by Crazy Diamond's powers into a stone that becomes Morioh's tourist attraction Angelo Rock. (Note: Angelo Rock (アンジェロ岩, Anjero Iwa))
- Yukako Yamagishi (Note: Yukako Yamagishi (山岸 由花子, Yamagishi Yukako)) is a high school student who develops an obsessive crush on Koichi. She kidnaps him and tries to form him into a "better man" by taking drastic measures to improve his grades. Koichi defends himself with the help of Echoes ACT2 and Yukako instead decides to admire Koichi from afar. However she soon sinks into depression and learns of a beauty salon named Cinderella from Joseph Joestar, which she uses to help rekindle her relationship with Koichi. Afterwards, she and Koichi become a couple. Her Stand is Love Deluxe, (Note: Love Deluxe (ラブ・デラックス, Rabu Derakkusu)) which is bound to her hair, allowing her to grow her hair to long lengths and freely manipulate it.
- Aya Tsuji (Note: Aya Tsuji (辻 彩, Tsuji Aya)) is the owner of the Cinderella Salon, a beauty clinic in Morioh. She changes people's appearance and fate using her stand, Cinderella. (Note: Cinderella (シンデレラ, Shinderera)) She is killed by Yoshikage Kira after being forced to use her Stand to change his face so he can avoid capture.
- Akira Otoishi (Note: Akira Otoishi (音石 明, Otoishi Akira)) is an aspiring rock star guitarist. His Stand is Red Hot Chili Pepper, (Note: Red Hot Chili Pepper (レッド・ホット・チリ・ペッパー, Reddo Hotto Chiri Peppā; "Chili Pepper" in English versions)) which draws its powers from electricity and can travel through various electrical outlets. He acquired his Stand after being shot with the Arrow by Keicho Nijimura.
- Yoshikage Kira (Note: Yoshikage Kira (吉良 吉影, Kira Yoshikage)) is a hand-obsessed, mild-mannered serial killer who has been murdering women for more than 15 years. His Stand, Killer Queen, (Note: Killer Queen (キラークイーン, Kirā Kuīn; "Deadly Queen" in English versions)) has the ability to create a bomb out of whatever it touches—including living people—allowing him to eliminate any evidence of his crimes. Kira has access to three bombs—the standard "Primary Bomb", a mobile heat-seeking "Secondary Bomb" known as Sheer Heart Attack, (Note: Sheer Heart Attack (シアーハートアタック, Shiā Hāto Atakku)) and a time-looping "Tertiary Bomb" known as Bites the Dust. (Note: Bites the Dust (負けて死ね(バイツァ・ダスト), Baitsa Dasuto))
- Yoshihiro Kira (Note: Yoshihiro Kira (吉良 吉廣, Kira Yoshihiro) /) is the ghost of Kira's father whose Stand, Atom Heart Father, (Note: Atom Heart Father (アトム・ハート・ファーザー, Atomu Hāto Fāzā)) allows him to remain among the living to protect Kira from within a photograph. Having acquired a Bow and Arrow from Enya prior to moving to Morioh, Yoshihiro uses the arrow to create Stand users in an attempt to keep Josuke's group away from Kira.
- Mikitaka Hazekura (Note: Mikitaka Hazekura (支倉 未起隆, Hazekura Mikitaka)) is a strange individual who claims that he is an alien. He befriends Josuke and Okuyasu, and occasionally helps them out. Mikitaka uses the ability Earth Wind and Fire, (Note: Earth Wind and Fire (アース・ウインド・アンド・ファイヤー, Āsu Uindo Ando Faiyā; "Terra Ventus" in English versions)) allowing him to shapeshift into inanimate objects. It is ambiguous whether or not Mikitaka is actually an alien, or a normal human – additionally, it is unclear whether or not Earth Wind and Fire is a Stand or a similar ability.
- Yuya Fungami (Note: Yuya Fungami (噴上裕也, Fungami Yuya)) is a member of a motorcycle gang that used the stand Highway Star (Note: Highway Star (ハイウェイ・スター, Haiwei Sutā)) to absorb the life source of others to recover from his injuries in the hospital, however he redeemed himself for his actions and agreed to help Josuke track down Koichi with his keen sense of smell, even going so far as to personally confront Terunosuke Miyamoto to save them both. Yuya's Stand has a range of 60km per hour and in addition to sucking the opponent's life force, it can divide itself and launch a barrage of punches.
- Tama (Note: Tama (タマ, Tama)) is a British Shorthair that was struck by the arrow, then wandered into the Kawajiri household, and was accidentally killed by a broken glass bottle during Shinobu's attempt to chase him out. After his death, he was reborn as a hybrid of cat and plant due to the awakening of his stand, Stray Cat, (Note: Stray Cat (猫草(ストレイ・キャット), Sutorei Kyatto)) that, along with reviving Tama, has the ability to create bubbles of air to shoot at enemies, which Yoshikage Kira exploits later on to create bubble bombs.
- Reimi Sugimoto (Note: Reimi Sugimoto (杉本 鈴美, Sugimoto Reimi)) is Yoshikage Kira's first victim. She was killed 15 years before the happenings of the manga, and waited as a ghost for someone whom she could warn about her killer.
- Kosaku Kawajiri is an average salaryman working as an employee at S-Corp. He is Shinobu Kawajiri's husband, and the father of Hayato Kawajiri. He, according to his wife, is extremely boring, and is shown to be very irresponsible with money, as he is in debt to his landlord on a house he cannot afford, bought an expensive car, and still has to pay for Hayato's college tuition. He is killed by Yoshikage Kira at the Cinderella Salon, who then proceeded to steal his identity, and integrate himself into his family.
- Shinobu Kawajiri is the wife of Kosaku Kawajiri, and Hayato's mother. After Yoshikage Kira killed Kosaku and stole his identity, Yoshikage Kira began treating Shinobu better than Kosaku did originally, renewing Shinobu's love for her husband, who, unbeknownst to her, and for a time, Hayato, was not in fact her husband.
- Hayato Kawajiri (Note: Hayato Kawajiri (川尻 早人, Kawajiri Hayato)) is a shy and intelligent schoolboy who realized his father Kosaku Kawajiri was murdered by Kira when the killer assumed his identity. Though Kira decided to use the boy as a means to kill Josuke's group, Hayato ended up being the killer's downfall. Hayato does not have a Stand of his own, but he winds up being the host of Killer Queen: Bites the Dust, resulting in anyone who tries to interrogate Hayato about Kira's current whereabouts spontaneously exploding, followed by time rewinding an hour.
- Tonio Trussardi (Note: Tonio Trussardi (トニオ・トラサルディー, Tonio Torasarudī)) is a talented Italian chief who runs a restaurant called "Trattoria Trussardi". He first encounters Josuke and Okuyasu when they are paying a visit to the grave of Keicho. His Stand is called Pearl Jam, (Note: Pearl Jam (パール・ジャム, Pāru Jamu)) which allows to cure, heal and strengthen a person, though it destroys whatever organ its healing first, giving off a gruesome impression. This Stand is different from the other Stands as it is born from Tonio's zeal to perfect his culinary arts rather than by an Arrow, hence he uses it mostly for his cooking methods.
- Tomoko Higashikata (Note: Tomoko Higashikata (東方 智子, Higashikata Tomoko)) is the mother of Josuke Higashikata and the mistress of Joseph Joestar. A hot-tempered and fiercely protective woman, she is first shown violently confronting a man for catcalling her. Her enduring love for Joseph is revealed in a moment of mistaken identity, where she emotionally embraces Jotaro, believing him to be Joseph, before realizing her error.

== Production ==
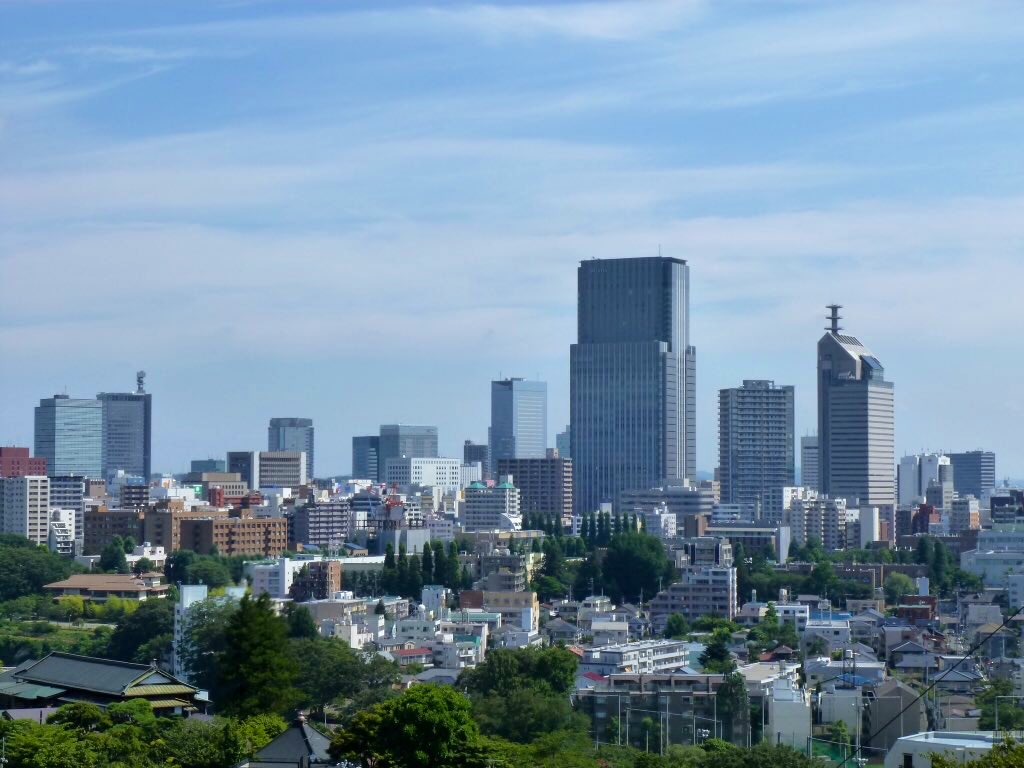
Morioh was based on Araki's hometown of Sendai.

Diamond Is Unbreakable is set in the fictional town of Morioh located in S-City, M-Prefecture, which is modeled after a specific area in Hirohiko Araki's hometown of Sendai, Miyagi Prefecture. The author said that the suspense and fear caused by the "unusual" and "mysterious" residents there were his inspiration. Although he originally intended for JoJo's Bizarre Adventure to be a "mythical" manga with superpowers and such, he enjoyed drawing the "feeling of everyday life" in Diamond Is Unbreakable. Because he wanted to create a "closed city," the Stands featured were not proactively attacking.

During Diamond Is Unbreakable's serialization, Araki received feedback from readers who felt that enemies in the manga had gotten weak. Although he usually does not respond to reader opinions, he had heard similar comments from the editorial team and so made an exception by stating that "the weaknesses inside the hearts of people" are a thematic element of Part 4. He explained that sometimes he has a character's inner weaknesses drive them into a desperate situation, while other times he turns the weakness into something "dreadful" and bases a Stand off of it. Araki wrote that constantly having stronger and stronger enemies appear in a manga eventually leads you to "trying to think of the farthest edges of the universe", but in the real world, "true strength is found in not doing bad things. An enemy who does bad things is a person with an inner weakness."

With Part 4 of the series, Araki said that he moved away from "muscle men" as they fell out of popularity with his readers and he wanted to focus more on fashion. When designing his characters' outfits, Araki considers both everyday fashion and "cartoonish, bizarre clothing that would be impractical in real life." He also forgoes using specific color schemes for his characters and gives his readers different impressions through various color combinations. Araki said that while he drew several characters in Parts 1 through 3 naked to evoke Greek or Roman gods, he stopped doing it so much with Part 4 to be a "bit closer to home." Because he is the "friend next door" instead of being similar to a hero in a Greek myth like the protagonists of the previous parts, Araki cited Josuke Higashikata as his favorite character in Diamond Is Unbreakable. He cited Shigekiyo Yangu's Harvest as his favorite Stand from Part 4, because, although he finds his "flaws and trashiness adorable," the character picks up stuff off of the ground which is "pretty scary."

Despite the prevalent belief that the manga artist character Rohan Kishibe is believed to be Araki's self-insert, the author revealed that he did not model Rohan after himself, but is fascinated by him. He said that unlike Rohan, he values human life more than art.

== Chapters ==
In the original volumization, chapters 437–439 are collected in volume 47, listed on the Golden Wind page.

=== Original volumization (Jump Comics) ===
No.	Title	Japanese release date	Japanese ISBN
29	Enter Josuke Higashikata; Higashikata Jōsuke Tōjō Suru (東方仗助登場する)	November 4, 1992	978-4-08-851635-6
266–268. "Jotaro Kujo! Meets Josuke Higashikata (1–3)" (空条承太郎！東方仗助に会う その①〜③, Kūjō Jōtarō! Higashikata Jōsuke ni Au Sono 1~3); 269–273. "Josuke Higashikata! Meets Angelo (1–5)" (東方仗助！アンジェロに会う その①〜⑤, Higashikata Jōsuke! Anjero ni Au Sono 1~5); 274. "The Nijimura Brothers (1)" (虹村兄弟 その①, Nijimura Kyōdai Sono 1)
30	Okuyasu and Keicho Nijimura; Nijimura Okuyasu, Keichō (虹村億泰・形兆)	January 7, 1993	978-4-08-851636-3
275–283. "The Nijimura Brothers (2–10)" (虹村兄弟 その②〜⑩, Nijimura Kyōdai Sono 2~10)
31	Koichi Hirose (Echoes); Hirose Kōichi (Ekōzu) (広瀬康一（エコーズ）)	March 4, 1993	978-4-08-851637-0
284–288. "Koichi Hirose (Echoes) (1–5)" (広瀬康一（エコーズ） その①〜⑤, Hirose Kōichi (Ekōzu) Sono 1~5); 289–293. "Toshikazu Hazamada (Surface) (1–5)" (間田敏和（サーフィス） その①〜⑤, Hazamada Toshikazu (Sāfisu) Sono 1~5)
32	Yukako Yamagishi Falls In Love; Yamagishi Yukako wa Koi o Suru (山岸由花子は恋をする)	May 10, 1993	978-4-08-851638-7
294–302. "Yukako Yamagishi Falls In Love (1–9)" (山岸由花子は恋をする その①〜⑨, Yamagishi Yukako wa Koi o Suru Sono 1~9)
33	Let's Go Eat Some Italian Food; Itaria Ryōri o Tabe ni Ikō (イタリア料理を食べに行こう)	July 2, 1993	978-4-08-851639-4
303–306. "Let's Go Eat Some Italian Food (1–4)" (イタリア料理を食べに行こう その①〜④, Itaria Ryōri o Tabe ni Ikō Sono 1~4); 307–312. "Red Hot Chili Pepper (1–6)" (レッド・ホット・チリ・ペッパー その①〜⑥, Reddo Hotto Chiri Peppā Sono 1~6)
34	Let's Go to the Manga Artist's House; Mangaka no Uchi e Asobi ni Ikō (漫画家のうちへ遊びに行こう)	September 3, 1993	978-4-08-851640-0
313–314. "Red Hot Chili Pepper (7–8)" (レッド・ホット・チリ・ペッパー その⑦〜⑧, Reddo Hotto Chiri Peppā Sono 7~8); 315–317. "We Picked Up Something Crazy! (1–3)" (やばいものを拾ったっス! その①〜③, Yabaimono o Hirottassu! Sono 1~3); 318–321. "Let's Go to the Manga Artist's House (1–4)" (漫画家のうちへ遊びに行こう その①〜④, Mangaka no Uchi e Asobi ni Ikō Sono 1~4)
35	Rohan Kishibe's Adventure; Kishibe Rohan no Bōken (岸辺露伴の冒険)	November 4, 1993	978-4-08-851405-5
322–324. "Let's Go to the Manga Artist's House (5–7)" (漫画家のうちへ遊びに行こう その⑤〜⑦, Mangaka no Uchi e Asobi ni Ikō Sono 5~7); 325–329. "Let's Go Hunting! (1–5)" (｢狩り(ハンティング)｣に行こう! その①〜⑤, "Hantingu" ni Ikō! Sono 1~5); 330–331. "Rohan Kishibe's Adventure (1–2)" (岸辺露伴の冒険 その①〜②, Kishibe Rohan no Bōken Sono 1~2)
36	Shigechi's Harvest "Shigechī" no Hāvesuto (｢重ちー｣の収穫(ハーヴェスト))	February 4, 1994	978-4-08-851406-2
332–334. "Rohan Kishibe's Adventure (3–5)" (岸辺露伴の冒険 その③〜⑤, Kishibe Rohan no Bōken Sono 3~5); 335–341. "Shigechi's Harvest (1–7)" (｢重ちー｣の収穫(ハーヴェスト) その①〜⑦, "Shigechī" no Hāvesuto Sono 1~7)
37	Yoshikage Kira Wants to Live Quietly; Kira Yoshikage wa Shizuka ni Kurashitai (吉良吉影は静かに暮らしたい)	May 2, 1994	978-4-08-851407-9
342–346. "Yoshikage Kira Wants to Live Quietly (1–5)" (吉良吉影は静かに暮らしたい その①〜⑤, Kira Yoshikage wa Shizuka ni Kurashitai Sono 1~5); 347. "The People of Morioh" (杜王町の人々, Moriohchō no Hitobito); 348–350. "Yukako Yamagishi Dreams of Cinderella (1–3)" (山岸由花子はシンデレラに憧れる その①〜③, Yamagishi Yukako wa Shinderera ni Akogareru Sono 1~3)
38	Sheer Heart Attack; Shiā Hāto Atakku (シアーハートアタック)	August 4, 1994	978-4-08-851408-6
351–353. "Yukako Yamagishi Dreams of Cinderella (4–6)" (山岸由花子はシンデレラに憧れる その④〜⑥, Yamagishi Yukako wa Shinderera ni Akogareru Sono 4–6); 354–359. "Sheer Heart Attack (1–6)" (シアーハートアタック その①〜⑥, Shiā Hāto Atakku Sono 1–6)
39	Father's Tears; Chichi no Namida (父の涙)	November 4, 1994	978-4-08-851409-3
360–364. "Sheer Heart Attack (7–11)" (シアーハートアタック その⑦〜⑪, Shiā Hāto Atakku Sono 7–11); 365–369. "Atom Heart Father (1–5)" (アトム・ハート・ファーザー その①〜⑤, Atomu Hāto Fāzā Sono 1–5)
40	Rock-Paper-Scissors Kid Is Coming; Janken Kozō ga Yatte Kuru (ジャンケン小僧がやって来る！)	January 11, 1995	978-4-08-851410-9
370. "Yoshikage Kira's New Life (1)" (吉良吉影の新しい事情 その①, Kira Yoshikage no Atarashii Jijō Sono 1); 371–376. "Rosham Boy Is Here! (1–6)" (ジャンケン小僧がやって来る！ その①〜⑥, Janken Kozō ga Yatte Kuru! Sono 1–6; lit. 'Rock-Paper-Scissors Kid Is Coming! (1–6)'); 377. "Yoshikage Kira's New Life (2)" (吉良吉影の新しい事情 その②, Kira Yoshikage no Atarashii Jijō Sono 2); 378–379. "I Am An Alien (1–2)" (ぼくは宇宙人 その①〜②, Boku wa Uchūjin Sono 1–2)
41	Highway Star; Haiwei Sutā (ハイウェイ・スター)	March 3, 1995	978-4-08-851891-6
380–383. "I Am An Alien (3–6)" (ぼくは宇宙人 その③〜⑥, Boku wa Uchūjin Sono 3–6); 384–389. "Highway Star (1–6)" (ハイウェイ・スター その①〜⑥, Haiwei Sutā Sono 1–6)
42	Cats Love Yoshikage Kira; Neko wa Kira Yoshikage ga Suki (猫は吉良吉影が好き)	May 11, 1995	978-4-08-851892-3
390–391. "Highway Star (7–8)" (ハイウェイ・スター その⑦〜⑧, Haiwei Sutā Sono 7–8); 392–397. "Cats Love Yoshikage Kira (1–6)" (猫は吉良吉影が好き その①〜⑥, Neko wa Kira Yoshikage ga Suki Sono 1–6); 398. "Let's Live on a Transmission Tower (1)" (鉄塔に住もう その①, Tettō ni Sumō Sono 1)
43	Enigma Is an Enigma! Eniguma wa Nazo da! (エニグマは謎だ!)	August 4, 1995	978-4-08-851893-0
399–403. "Let's Live on a Transmission Tower (2–6)" (鉄塔に住もう その②〜⑥, Tettō ni Sumō Sono 2–6); 404–407. "Enigma (1–4)" (エニグマの少年 その①〜④, Eniguma no Shōnen Sono 1–4; lit. 'Enigma Boy (1–4)')
44	My Dad Is Not My Dad; Boku no Papa wa Papa ja Nai (ぼくのパパはパパじゃない)	October 4, 1995	978-4-08-851894-7
408–409. "Enigma (5–6)" (エニグマの少年 その⑤〜⑥, Eniguma no Shōnen Sono 5–6; lit. 'Enigma Boy (5–6)'); 410–411. "My Dad Is Not My Dad (1–2)" (ぼくのパパはパパじゃない その①〜②, Boku no Papa wa Papa ja Nai Sono 1–2); 412–417. "Cheap Trick (1–6)" (チープ・トリック その①〜⑥, Chīpu Torikku Sono 1–6)
45	Another One Bites the Dust; Anazāwan Baitsa Dasuto (アナザーワン バイツァ・ダスト)	January 10, 1996	978-4-08-851895-4
418–427. "Bites the Dust (1–10)" (アナザーワン バイツァ・ダスト その①〜⑩, Anazāwan Baitsa Dasuto Sono 1–10; lit. 'Another One Bites the Dust (1–10)')
46	Crazy Diamond Is Unbreakable; Kureijī Daiyamondo wa Kudakenai (クレイジー・D(ダイヤモンド)は砕けない)	March 4, 1996	978-4-08-851896-1
428–436. "Crazy Diamond Is Unbreakable (1–9)" (クレイジー・D(ダイヤモンド)は砕けない その①〜⑨, Kureijī Daiyamondo wa Kudakenai Sono 1–9) (Note: Chapters 437–439 were also included in this volume in some versions outside Japan.)

=== 2004 release (Shueisha Bunko) ===
No.	Title	Japanese release date	Japanese ISBN
18	Part 4: Diamond Is Not Crash 1 Part 4 Daiyamondo wa Kudakenai 1 (Part4 ダイヤモンドは砕けない 1)	February 18, 2004	4-08-618167-3
Chapters 266–279
19	Part 4: Diamond Is Not Crash 2 Part 4 Daiyamondo wa Kudakenai 2 (Part4 ダイヤモンドは砕けない 2)	February 18, 2004	4-08-618168-1
Chapters 280–293
20	Part 4: Diamond Is Not Crash 3 Part 4 Daiyamondo wa Kudakenai 3 (Part4 ダイヤモンドは砕けない 3)	April 16, 2004	4-08-618169-X
Chapters 294–308
21	Part 4: Diamond Is Not Crash 4 Part 4 Daiyamondo wa Kudakenai 4 (Part4 ダイヤモンドは砕けない 4)	April 16, 2004	4-08-618170-3
Chapters 309–322
22	Part 4: Diamond Is Not Crash 5 Part 4 Daiyamondo wa Kudakenai 5 (Part4 ダイヤモンドは砕けない 5)	May 18, 2004	4-08-618171-1
Chapters 323–337
23	Part 4: Diamond Is Not Crash 6 Part 4 Daiyamondo wa Kudakenai 6 (Part4 ダイヤモンドは砕けない 6)	May 18, 2004	4-08-618172-X
Chapters 338–352
24	Part 4: Diamond Is Not Crash 7 Part 4 Daiyamondo wa Kudakenai 7 (Part4 ダイヤモンドは砕けない 7)	June 18, 2004	4-08-618173-8
Chapters 353–367
25	Part 4: Diamond Is Not Crash 8 Part 4 Daiyamondo wa Kudakenai 8 (Part4 ダイヤモンドは砕けない 8)	June 18, 2004	4-08-618174-6
Chapters 368–382
26	Part 4: Diamond Is Not Crash 9 Part 4 Daiyamondo wa Kudakenai 9 (Part4 ダイヤモンドは砕けない 9)	July 16, 2004	4-08-618175-4
Chapters 383–397
27	Part 4: Diamond Is Not Crash 10; Part 4 Daiyamondo wa Kudakenai 10 (Part4 ダイヤモンドは砕けない 10)	July 16, 2004	4-08-618176-2
Chapters 398–411
28	Part 4: Diamond Is Not Crash 11; Part 4 Daiyamondo wa Kudakenai 11 (Part4 ダイヤモンドは砕けない 11)	August 10, 2004	4-08-618177-0
Chapters 412–425
29	Part 4: Diamond Is Not Crash 12; Part 4 Daiyamondo wa Kudakenai 12 (Part4 ダイヤモンドは砕けない 12)	August 10, 2004	4-08-618178-9
Chapters 426–439

=== 2016 release (Shueisha Manga Soshuhen) ===
No.	Title	Japanese release date	Japanese ISBN
1 (9)	Part 4: Diamond Is Unbreakable Sōshūhen Vol. 1 Dai Yon Bu Daiyamondo wa Kudakenai Sōshūhen Vol. 1 (第4部 ダイヤモンドは砕けない 総集編 Vol. 1)	March 4, 2016	978-4-08-111142-8
2 (10)	Part 4: Diamond Is Unbreakable Sōshūhen Vol. 2 Dai Yon Bu Daiyamondo wa Kudakenai Sōshūhen Vol. 2 (第4部 ダイヤモンドは砕けない 総集編 Vol. 2)	April 1, 2016	978-4-08-111143-5
3 (11)	Part 4: Diamond Is Unbreakable Sōshūhen Vol. 3 Dai Yon Bu Daiyamondo wa Kudakenai Sōshūhen Vol. 3 (第4部 ダイヤモンドは砕けない 総集編 Vol. 3)	May 6, 2016	978-4-08-111144-2
4 (12)	Part 4: Diamond Is Unbreakable Sōshūhen Vol. 4 Dai Yon Bu Daiyamondo wa Kudakenai Sōshūhen Vol. 4 (第4部 ダイヤモンドは砕けない 総集編 Vol. 4)	June 3, 2016	978-4-08-111145-9
5 (13)	Part 4: Diamond Is Unbreakable Sōshūhen Vol. 5 Dai Yon Bu Daiyamondo wa Kudakenai Sōshūhen Vol. 5 (第4部 ダイヤモンドは砕けない 総集編 Vol. 5)	July 1, 2016	978-4-08-111146-6
6 (14)	Part 4: Diamond Is Unbreakable Sōshūhen Vol. 6 Dai Yon Bu Daiyamondo wa Kudakenai Sōshūhen Vol. 6 (第4部 ダイヤモンドは砕けない 総集編 Vol. 6)	August 5, 2016	978-4-08-111147-3

=== English release ===
No.	English release date	English ISBN
1 (18) (Note: Continuing from the English JoJonium releases of Parts 1–3.)	May 7, 2019	978-1-9747-0652-5
Chapters 1–18
2 (19)	August 6, 2019	978-1-9747-0808-6
Chapters 19–37
3 (20)	November 5, 2019	978-1-9747-0809-3
Chapters 38–56
4 (21)	February 4, 2020	978-1-9747-0810-9
Chapters 57–76
5 (22)	May 5, 2020	978-1-9747-0811-6
Chapters 77–94
6 (23)	August 4, 2020	978-1-9747-0812-3
Chapters 95–114
7 (24)	November 3, 2020	978-1-9747-0813-0
Chapters 115–133
8 (25)	February 2, 2021	978-1-9747-0814-7
Chapters 134–152
9 (26)	May 4, 2021	978-1-9747-0815-4
Chapters 153–174

== Related media ==
In 2000, it was announced that Otsuichi would be writing a novel based on Part 4. The novel proved difficult to complete; in Kono Mystery ga Sugoi 2004, Otsuichi claimed to have written over 2000 pages, but thrown them all out. Intent on writing a novel that lived up to the manga, it took him until 2007 before The Book: JoJo's Bizarre Adventure 4th Another Day was finally released on November 26. It is set after the events in the manga, and includes illustrations by Araki.

In 1997, Araki published the Weekly Shōnen Jump one-shot Thus Spoke Rohan Kishibe ~Episode 16.. Confessional~, starring Rohan after the events of Part 4. In 1999 he wrote the three-chapter story Dead Man's Questions (Note: Dead Man's Questions (デッドマンズQ, Deddo Manzu Q)) in Allman magazine. Dead Man's Questions stars Yoshikage Kira, the main antagonist of Part 4. Both Thus Spoke Rohan Kishibe and Dead Man's Questions were later compiled in Araki's one-shot collection, Under Jailbreak, Under Execution, in 1999. The former launched a series starring Rohan, Thus Spoke Kishibe Rohan.

The issue of Jump Square for December 11, 2007, featured a second entry into the Thus Spoke Rohan Kishibe collection, entitled Thus Spoke Rohan Kishibe ~Mutsukabezaka~, set seven years after the events of Part IV.

In 2009, Araki wrote the full-color story Rohan au Louvre. (Note: Rohan au Louvre (岸辺露伴 ルーヴルへ行く, Kishibe Rohan Rūvuru e iku)) The short story was displayed at the Musée du Louvre as part of their 2009 Le Louvre invite la bande dessinée exhibit. The story was later republished in Ultra Jump in 2010. In 2012, Rohan au Louvre was released in English by NBM Publishing under the translated title Rohan at the Louvre.

In 2011, Araki collaborated with the renowned Italian fashion brand Gucci for the short story Rohan Kishibe Goes to Gucci (Note: Rohan Kishibe Goes to Gucci (岸辺露伴 グッチへ行く, Kishibe Rohan Gutchi e Iku)) in the women's fashion magazine Spur.

In 2012, Araki wrote a third Thus Spoke Rohan Kishibe one-shot for Weekly Shōnen Jump. Entitled Thus Spoke Rohan Kishibe ~Episode 5: Millionaire Village~ it was released in the October 6, 2012 issue of the magazine.

In October 2015, Warner Bros. announced that Part 4 would receive an anime television adaptation that serves as a continuation of David Production's series adaptation. The series aired in 2016.

Toho and Warner Bros. partnered to produce a live-action film based on the fourth arc of JoJo's Bizarre Adventure that was released on August 4, 2017. Takashi Miike directed the film that stars Kento Yamazaki as Josuke. Both studios planned for worldwide distribution and, with a title of JoJo's Bizarre Adventure: Diamond Is Unbreakable Chapter I, hoped to create sequels. However, the film under-performed at the box office, leaving the possibility of future sequels in doubt.

JoJo's Bizarre Adventure: Shining Diamond's Demonic Heartbreak, a spin-off manga set in Morioh, written by Kouhei Kadono and illustrated by Tasuku Karasuma, was serialized from December 2021 to May 2023 in Shueisha's seinen manga magazine Ultra Jump, with its chapters collected in three tankōbon volumes. A light novel adaptation, also written by Kadono, was released in June 2023.

The Cheap Trick story arc was adapted into the episode "From Behind" of the Thus Spoke Rohan Kishibe TV series released on December 28, 2021. The Rosham Boy Is Here! story arc was adapted into the episode "Rock-Paper-Scissors Boy" released on December 27, 2022.

== Reception ==
In a 2018 survey of 17,000 JoJo's Bizarre Adventure fans, Diamond Is Unbreakable was chosen as the second favorite story arc with 17.5% of the vote.

Anime News Network had both Rebecca Silverman and Faye Hopper review the first volume of Diamond Is Unbreakable. Silverman called the beginning slower and not as instantly engrossing as the previous parts, but felt this allowed Josuke, whom she and Hopper both described as kinder than the previous protagonists, to develop as a character. Hopper stated that Diamond Is Unbreakable is sometimes criticized for a "lack of a strong narrative throughline" in comparison to other parts, but argued that this is one of its greatest strengths as it allows the main characters to "simply be, lending them an amiable humanity that none of the over-the-top archetypes in the first 3 Parts ever had."
