= JoJo's Bizarre Adventure: Shining Diamond's Demonic Heartbreak =

Japanese manga series

- JoJo's Bizarre Adventure: Crazy Diamond's Demonic Heartbreak
- Volume 1 cover, depicting Josuke (left) and Hol Horse

ジョジョの奇妙な冒険 クレイジー・D(ダイヤモンド)の悪霊的失恋 (Jojo no Kimyō na Bōken: Kureijī Daiyamondo no Akuryō-teki Shitsuren)
- Manga
- Written by: Kouhei Kadono
- Illustrated by: Tasuku Karasuma
- Published by: Shueisha
- English publisher: NA: Viz Media
- Imprint: Jump Comics
- Magazine: Ultra Jump
- Original run: December 18, 2021 – May 19, 2023
- Volumes: 3
- Light novel
- Written by: Kouhei Kadono
- Published by: Shueisha
- Published: June 19, 2023
- icon

JoJo's Bizarre Adventure: Shining Diamond's Demonic Heartbreak (Note: Japanese: Jojo no Kimyō na Bōken: Kureijī Daiyamondo no Akuryō-teki Shitsuren (ジョジョの奇妙な冒険 クレイジー・D(ダイヤモンド)の悪霊的失恋; JoJo's Bizarre Adventure: Crazy Diamond's Demonic Heartbreak)) is a Japanese manga series written by Kouhei Kadono and drawn by Tasuku Karasuma. It is a spin-off from Hirohiko Araki's manga JoJo's Bizarre Adventure, narratively set between its third and fourth parts. It was serialized by Shueisha in their monthly magazine Ultra Jump from December 2021 to May 2023, with its chapters collected in three tankōbon volumes. A light novel adaptation, also written by Kadono, was released in June 2023.

== Plot ==
Shining Diamond's Demonic Heartbreak is a spin-off from Hirohiko Araki's JoJo's Bizarre Adventure, and is set in March 1999, a decade after the events of Stardust Crusaders and a month before the events of Diamond Is Unbreakable. Ten years after Dio's death, Hol Horse is among those who survived Dio and attempt to resume their normal lives. One day, Hol Horse accepts a request from the mother of Pet Shop's original owner to find her son's other pet, a parrot named Petsounds who also possesses a Stand. Following an encounter with Mariah, Hol Horse enlists Boingo to aid him with the latter's Stand Tohth, which advises the two to visit Morioh. There, the two encounter high school freshman Josuke Higashikata, as well as Ryoko Kakyoin, Noriaki Kakyoin's cousin who blames herself for causing her cousin's meeting with Dio and eventual death. Eventually, it is revealed that Petsounds is being used by a police officer named Kazuki Karaiya, the grandson of a surviving member of the vampires that the Pillar Man Kars created in the 1930s, who believes he has the right to rule over others. After the villain's defeat, Hol Horse tells Ryoko about her cousin's fate, and the heroes part amicably.

== Characters ==
- Hol Horse (Note: Hol Horse (ホル・ホース, Horu Hōsu)) is a former servant of Dio who fought against Jotaro Kujo and his allies in 1988. Ten years after Dio's defeat, he is tasked with finding and returning Petsounds to its rightful owner. Hol Horse wields the Stand Emperor, (Note: Emperor (皇帝(エンペラー), Enperā)) a long range Stand resembling a gun that can steer the bullets it fires.
- Josuke Higashikata (Note: Josuke Higashikata (東方 仗助, Higashikata Jōsuke)) is the illegitimate son of Joseph Joestar. He is a freshman who lives in the town of Morioh with his mother and grandfather. After meeting Hol Horse, Josuke decides to involve himself in the gunslinger's mission. His Stand is Crazy Diamond, (Note: Crazy Diamond (クレイジー・ダイヤモンド, Kureijī Daiyamondo)) (Note: In the official English releases, Crazy Diamond is named "Shining Diamond".) which can restore objects to their original state or rearrange their structure, allowing him to heal injuries or revert complex structures to their raw components.
- Ryoko Kakyoin (Note: Ryoko Kakyoin (花京院 涼子, Kakyōin Ryōko)) is the younger cousin of the late Noriaki Kakyoin. Still seeking answers about her cousin's death, Ryoko is soon caught up in the conflict between Hol Horse and Petsounds. She gains the power of Thoth after Boingo abandons the Stand, which she hopes will lead her to the answers she seeks.
- Boingo (Note: Boingo (ボインゴ, Boingo)) is an insecure young man living with his older brother. Hol Horse enlists him to help in tracking down and capturing Petsounds. His Stand is Thoth, (Note: Thoth (トト神, Toto-shin)) a comic book that depicts unavoidable predictions of the near future. Soon after arriving in Japan, Boingo parts ways with the book, which falls into Ryoko's hands.
- Petsounds (Note: Petsounds (ペットサウンズ, Pettosaunzu), "Pet Sounds" (ペット・サウンズ, Petto Saunzu) in the light novel adaptation) is a parrot trained alongside Pet Shop from Stardust Crusaders. After killing their trainer, Dio adopted the two birds as subordinates. Ten years after Dio's death, Petsounds is suddenly stolen from its trainer's grandmother and brought to Morioh, where it is allowed to wreak havoc. Petsounds's unnamed Stand can replay any event that it has witnessed, forcing its victims to relive the actions and feelings of the roles they are forced into.
- Kazuki Karaiya (Note: Kazuki Karaiya (仮頼谷 一樹, Karaiya Kazuki)) is a police officer in the town of Morioh. He steals Petsounds from its owner in Egypt in order to fulfill his ambitions of gaining complete power over others. Karaiya is not a Stand user himself, but can control Petsounds and its Stand after having the parrot swallow part of his earlobe.
- Koji Kiyohara (Note: Koji Kiyohara (清原 幸治, Kiyohara Kōji)) is a university student who takes pleasure in killing innocent animals with a crossbow. Karaiya, noticing his twisted personality, manipulates him into working alongside Petsounds to attack the officer's enemies.

== Production and release ==
Shining Diamond's Demonic Heartbreak is written by Kouhei Kadono and drawn by Tasuku Karasuma, and is the second JoJo's Bizarre Adventure spin-off manga after Araki's Thus Spoke Rohan Kishibe. The manga started its serialization in Shueisha's monthly seinen manga magazine Ultra Jump on December 18, 2021. The series finished on May 19, 2023. Shueisha published the series in three collected tankōbon volumes from June 17, 2022, to June 19, 2023.

The manga has been licensed for English release by Viz Media under the title JoJo's Bizarre Adventure: Shining Diamond's Demonic Heartbreak. The volumes were released between December 3, 2024, and April 1, 2025.

=== Volumes ===
No.	Original release date	Original ISBN	English release date	English ISBN
1	June 17, 2022	978-4-08-883157-2	December 3, 2024	978-1-9747-4990-4
Chapter 1–5
2	December 19, 2022	978-4-08-883354-5	February 4, 2025	978-1-9747-5187-7
Chapter 6–10
3	June 19, 2023	978-4-08-883543-3	April 1, 2025	978-1-9747-5243-0
Chapter 11–16

== Reception ==
Volume 1 of the series debuted with an estimated 35,000 copies sold, as the seventeenth highest selling comic of the week on the Japanese Oricon sales charts, with an additional 38,000 copies in its second week. The second volume debuted higher, at ninth place with 54,000 copies sold. By December 2022, Shueisha reported that the series had reached 300,000 copies in circulation, including digital sales.
