= Branagan =

Branagan is a surname. Notable people with the surname include:

- Carolyn Whitney Branagan (born 1954), American politician
- Keith Branagan (born 1966), English-born Republic of Ireland footballer
- Ken Branagan (1930–2008), English footballer
- Ritchie Peter Branagan (born 1991), English-born Republic of Ireland footballer
- Jim Branagan (born 1955), English footballer

== See also ==
- Brannigan (disambiguation)
