= Hand fetishism =

Sexual fascination with hands

- Other names: Cheirophilia, hand partialism
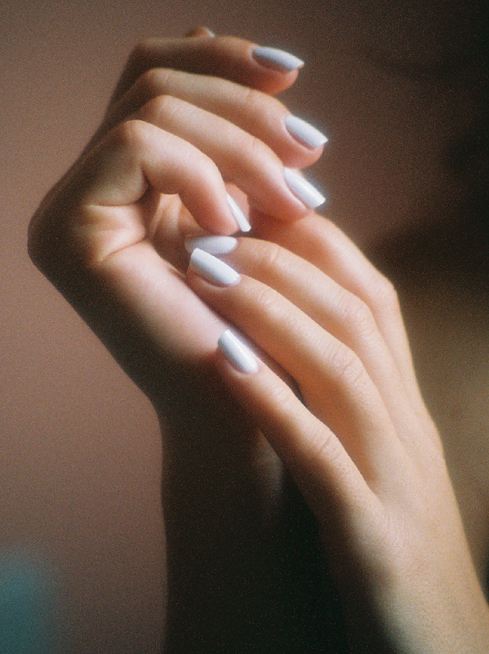
- Female hands
- Specialty: Psychology, Psychiatry, Sexology, Fetishism
- Symptoms: Sexual attraction to hands, fingers, nails, or hand-related actions
- Types: Partialism
- Risk factors: May co-occur with other paraphilic interests
- Differential diagnosis: Foot fetishism, Objectophilia

Hand fetishism, hand partialism or cheirophilia is the sexual fetish for hands. This may include the sexual attraction to a specific area such as the fingers, palm, back of the hand and/or nails, or the attraction to a specific action performed by the hands; which may otherwise be considered non-sexual—such as washing and drying dishes, painting of the fingernails and nail-biting. This fetish may manifest itself as a desire to experience physical interaction or as a source of sexual fantasy.

== Frequency ==
In 2007, a study was conducted by the University of Bologna on around 5000 fetishist participants to see the prevalence of fetishes. The study analyzed the content inside online fetish communities and found only 669 participants (approximately 13%) referring to nails, an extension of hand fetishism.

== Underlying causes ==
A gentle, caring hand touch can create an instant feeling of reassurance. This happens because it triggers the release of oxytocin, and it calms the amygdala and lowers stress hormones. Certain people, including people with stress-related disorders, encounter a sudden dropdown in stress hormones, which can recover sexual desire partially. In such cases, the hand is not just a source of comfort but has become a trigger that channels the same oxytocin-mediated sense of safety into the pathway of sexual arousal.

== In popular culture ==
In Brandon Sanderson's The Stormlight Archive, Vorin culture dictates that a woman's left hand ("safe hand") should remain covered in public settings. In the lower classes ("darkeyes") this may be accomplished with a glove. In the upper classes ("lighteyes") it is more commonly done with a garment called a "havah", which is a dress with an elongated left sleeve that encompasses the hand. The havah "safe hand" sleeve fastens at the end (often with buttons) and may also contain a pouch to secure money ("spheres") and other small objects. Fans of the Stormlight Archive (who collectively refer to themselves as "Dougs") have consistently applied Rule 34 across Sanderson's work and eagerly interpreted safe hand voyeurism into a form of hand fetishism (example).

In JoJo's Bizarre Adventure part 4, primary antagonist Yoshikage Kira has an intense hand fetish that causes him to murder women and sever their hands for his personal pleasure, with his fetish being awakened by masturbating to the Mona Lisa's hands before the main timeline of the part.

== See also ==
- Foot fetishism – Sexual fascination with feet
- Yoshikage Kira – Fourth story arc of JoJo's Bizarre Adventure
