= Darla =

Darla is a female given name of English origin which is a variant of Darlene. Darla means “Darling”

Darla may refer to:

== People ==
- Darla K. Anderson (fl. 1993–present), American film producer
- Darla Hood (1931–1979), American child actress, best known for her role in the Our Gang series
- Darla Moore (born 1954), American businesswoman
- Darla Pacheco (born 1989), Puerto Rican model
- Darla Vandenbossche (born 1963), Canadian actress

== Fictional characters ==
- Darla (Buffy the Vampire Slayer), a vampire in Buffy the Vampire Slayer
- Darla (Finding Nemo), character in the animated film Finding Nemo
- Darla Aquista, also called the Warlock's Daughter, a DC Comics character
- Darla Dudley, a DC Comics character from Shazam! comics and a member of the Shazam Family
- Darla Forrester, in The Bold and the Beautiful
- Darla Dimple, the main antagonist of the 1997 animated musical comedy film Cats Don't Dance

== Other uses ==
- Darla (Angel episode)
- Darla (dog), animal actor who played "Precious" in Silence of the Lambs
- Darla Records, an American record label
