= Jolene (given name) =

- Gender: Female

Origin
- Origin: English
- Meaning: Combination of Jo and the suffix -lene.

Jolene is a feminine given name derived from a combination of the name Jo with the suffix -lene, common in other names in fashion during the middle of the 20th century such as Marlene. It came into greater use in the 1940s but increased in popularity following the release of the 1973 song "Jolene" by Dolly Parton.

== Variant forms ==
Jolene has several spelling variations:

- Joelene
- Joleen
- Joleene
- Jolene
- Joliene
- Joline
- Jouline
- Jolin
- Jolleen
- Jollene
- Jolyn
- Jolyne
- Jolynn
- Joleane
- Jolean

== Notable people ==
- Jolene Anderson (born 1980), Australian actress
- Jolene Blalock (born 1975), American actress from Star Trek: Enterprise
- Jolene Brand (born 1934), American actress
- Jolene Chin (born 1980), Malaysian beauty queen
- Jolene Marie Cholock-Rotinsulu (born 1996), Puteri Indonesia Lingkungan 2019
- Jolene Creighton (born 1985), American journalist
- Jolene Henderson (born 1991), American softball pitcher
- Jolene Ivey (born 1961), American politician
- Jolene Jacobs (born 1992), Namibian sprinter
- Jolene Koester (born 1948), American academic administrator
- Jolene Purdy (born 1983), American actress from Orange Is The New Black
- Jolene Rickard (born 1956), Tuscarora artist, curator and visual historian
- Jolene Siana (born 1969), American writer
- Jolene Unsoeld (1931–2021), American politician
- Jolene Van Vugt (born 1980), Canadian motocross champion
- Jolene Watanabe (1968–2019), American tennis player
- Jolene Yazzie (born 1978), American graphic designer

== Usage ==
Jolene ranks 624 out of 4275 for females of all ages in the 1990 U.S. Census. The name has been in use in the United States since at least the late 1920s and ranked among the top 1,000 names for newborn American girls between 1928 and 1993 and again between 2010 and 2025.

== In popular culture ==
Dolly Parton's 1973 song "Jolene" is about the protagonist begging a beautiful woman named Jolene to not take her husband.

The sixth story arc of the manga series JoJo's Bizarre Adventure, titled Stone Ocean, features a main protagonist named Jolyne Cujoh.

In Paper Mario: The Thousand-Year Door, Jolene is a Toad that runs the Glitz Pit, a fighting arena located in Glitzville.
