= Jolene (disambiguation) =

"Jolene" is a song by Dolly Parton.

Jolene may also refer to:

== Music ==
- Jolene (album), an album by Dolly Parton
- Jolene (band), an American alt-country band
- "Jolene", a song by Ewert and The Two Dragons on the 2011 album Good Man Down
- "Jolene", a song by Bob Dylan on the 2009 album Together Through Life
- "Jolene", a song by Ray LaMontagne on the 2004 album Trouble
  - "Jolene", a cover of the Ray LaMontagne song by Zac Brown Band on the 2008 album The Foundation
- "Jolene", a song by Cake on the 1994 album Motorcade of Generosity
- "Jolene", a song by The White Stripes on the 2010 album Under Great White Northern Lights
- "Jolene", a trumpet solo by James F. Burke

== Other uses ==
- Jolene (given name), a female given name
- "Jolene: A Life", a short story by E. L. Doctorow
  - Jolene (film), a 2008 American drama film directed by Dan Ireland, based on the short story
