= Patrick Francis Branigan =

Sir Patrick Francis Branigan, QC (1906–2000) was an Irish-born barrister and colonial administrator. A member of the Colonial Legal Service, Branigan drafted the Maltese constitution of 1947 and the Gold Coast constitution.
