= Joline Godfrey =

- Education: University of Maine; Boston University
- Occupations: Author, social worker
- Website: joline-godfrey.com

Joline Godfrey is an author, clinical social worker and founder and Chief Creative Officer for The Unexpected Table.

== Education ==
Godfrey is a native of Bangor, Maine, and a graduate of the University of Maine and Boston University, where she received an MSW.

== Career ==
Godfrey began her career as a clinical social worker. She then became an executive of the Polaroid Corporation, where she provided in-house family and therapeutic services to officers and employees. Around 1985, after leaving Polaroid, she launched Odysseum, a creativity training company, which she later sold.

In 1992, an article she wrote for Inc. led her to launch An Income of Her Own, a non-profit offering financial education for girls. Godfrey organized a seminar also titled An Income of Her Own to show girls that business ownership is an option to them as well as to familiarize them with basic concepts and language and provide business role models. In 1994, she began Camp Start Up, a camp for girls ages 13–18 to learn skills needed for business, from how to create a company and build a network to playing golf. She later founded Independent Means (IMI) in 1996, based in Santa Barbara, CA.

She went on to found Bounce10, a financial parenting membership platform.

== Books ==
- Godfrey, Joline (1992). Our Wildest Dreams: Women Entrepreneurs Making Money, Having Fun, Doing Good. New York: Harper Collins. ISBN 978-0-88730-545-0.
- Godfrey, Joline (1995). No More Frogs to Kiss: 99 Ways to Give Economic Power to Girls. Harper Collins. ISBN 978-0-88730-659-4.
- Godfrey, Joline (2000). 20 $ecrets to Money and Independence. St. Martin's Press. ISBN 978-0-312-26279-2.
- Godfrey, Joline (2003). Raising Financially Fit Kids. Random House Digital, Inc. ISBN 978-1-58008-536-6.
