= Jolene Siana =

American writer (born 1969)

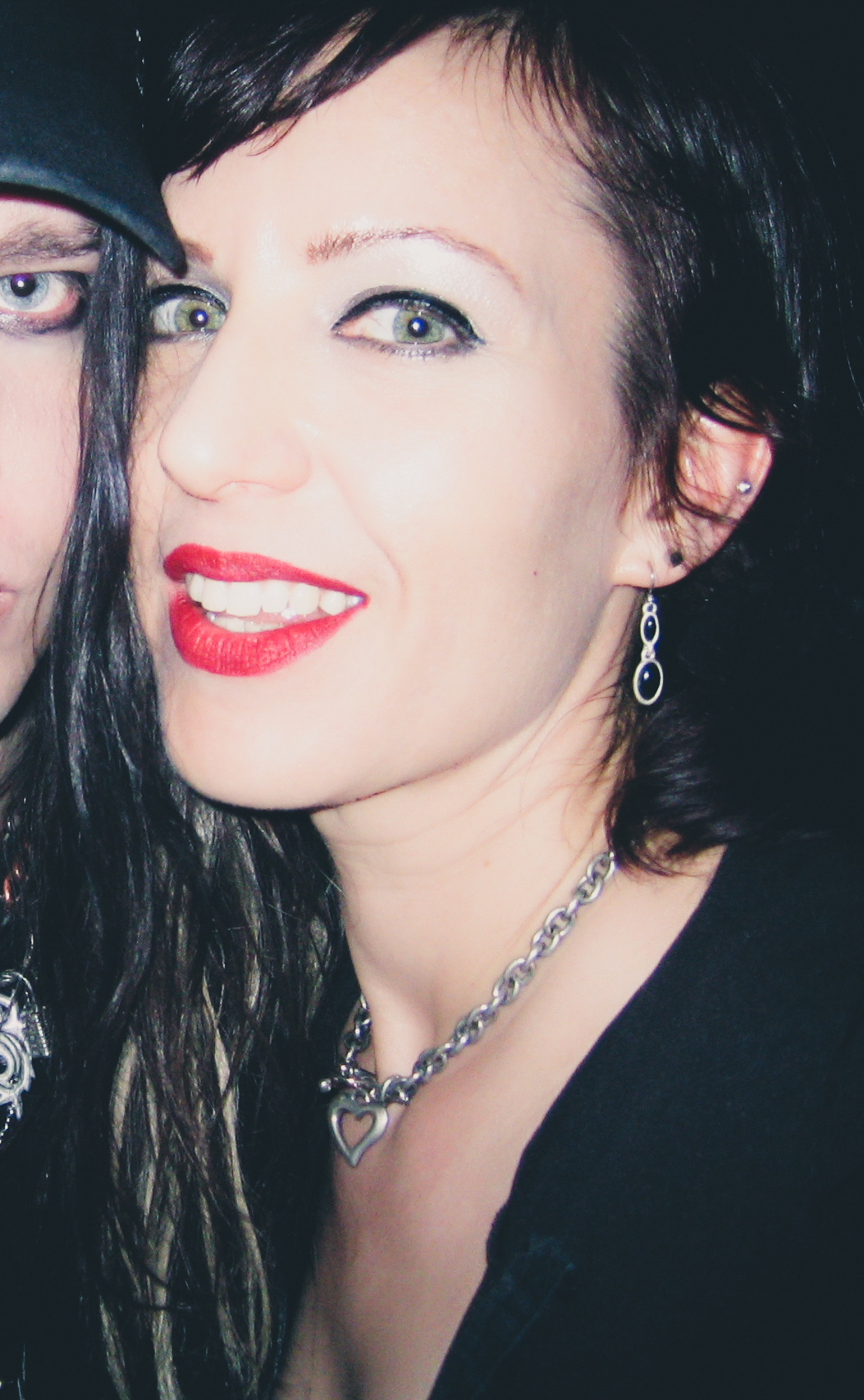
Siana in 2010.

Jolene Marie Siana (born June 10, 1969) is an American author of Go Ask Ogre: Letters from a Deathrock Cutter, published by Process Media (2005).

== Early life and education ==
Jolene was born in Toledo, Ohio to a single mother in 1969. She attended The University of Toledo for one year and then transferred to The Art Institute of Pittsburgh where she was able to focus exclusively on Photography. After graduating from art school, she relocated to Los Angeles, where she wrote and published her memoir, Go Ask Ogre. Jolene moved from Los Angeles to New York City in 2006.

== Awards ==
- Finalist: Best Juvenile/Teen Young Adult Non-fiction, 2006 Independent Publisher Awards: Go Ask Ogre by Jolene Siana
- 2006 New York Public Library Books for the Teen Age

== Bibliography ==
- Go Ask Ogre: Letters from a Deathrock Cutter ISBN 0-9760822-1-7
- Brooklyn Public Library
