= Branigan Lake =

- Location within California
- Location: Yosemite National Park, Tuolumne County, California
- Coordinates: 38.030°N 119.688°W
- Type: lake

Branigan Lake is a lake in Yosemite National Park, California.

Branigan Lake was named in the 1890s for a member of the military.

== See also ==
- List of lakes in California
