= JoJo's Bizarre Adventure =

Japanese manga series by Hirohiko Araki

- First tankōbon volume cover of Phantom Blood, featuring Dio Brando (left), Jonathan Joestar (center right), and Danny (bottom right)

ジョジョの奇妙な冒険 (JoJo no Kimyō na Bōken)
- Genre: Adventure; Supernatural
- Manga
- Written by: Hirohiko Araki
- Published by: Shueisha
- English publisher: NA: Viz Media
- Imprint: Jump Comics
- Magazine: Weekly Shōnen Jump; (1987–2004); Ultra Jump; (2005–present)
- Original run: January 1, 1987 – present
- Volumes: 140
- Manga parts
- 1. Phantom Blood (1987–1988); 2. Battle Tendency (1988–1989); 3. Stardust Crusaders (1989–1992); 4. Diamond Is Unbreakable (1992–1995); 5. Golden Wind (1995–1999); 6. Stone Ocean (1999–2003); 7. Steel Ball Run (2004–2011); 8. JoJolion (2011–2021); 9. The JoJoLands (2023–present)
- Anime
- JoJo's Bizarre Adventure (OVA series); Phantom Blood (film); JoJo's Bizarre Adventure (TV series)
- Related media
- Video games; Light novels; Spin-offs; JoJo's Bizarre Adventure: Diamond Is Unbreakable Chapter I (live-action film); Thus Spoke Rohan Kishibe; Shining Diamond's Demonic Heartbreak
- icon

JoJo's Bizarre Adventure (Japanese: ジョジョの奇妙な冒険, Hepburn: JoJo no Kimyō na Bōken) is a Japanese manga series written and illustrated by Hirohiko Araki. It was originally serialized in Shueisha's shōnen manga magazine Weekly Shōnen Jump from 1987 to 2004, and was transferred to the monthly seinen manga magazine Ultra Jump in 2005. The series is divided into a total of nine main story arcs, each following a new protagonist bearing the "JoJo" nickname. JoJo's Bizarre Adventure is one of the largest manga series by number of volumes, with its chapters collected in 140 tankōbon volumes as of September 2026.

From 1993 to 2002, A.P.P.P. produced a 13-episode original video animation (OVA) adapting the manga's third part, Stardust Crusaders. The studio later produced an anime film adapting the first part, Phantom Blood, which was released in theaters in Japan in February 2007. In October 2012, an anime television series produced by David Production adapting Phantom Blood and Battle Tendency premiered on Tokyo MX. As of December 2022, the studio has produced five seasons consisting of 190 total episodes, adapting through the manga's sixth part, Stone Ocean. An anime adaptation of the manga's seventh part, Steel Ball Run was announced in April 2025. A live-action film based on the fourth part, Diamond Is Unbreakable, was directed by Takashi Miike and released in Japan in August 2017.

JoJo's Bizarre Adventure is well known for its art style and character poses, frequent references to Western popular music and fashion, and battles centered around Stands, psycho-spiritual manifestations of the person's fighting spirit with unique supernatural abilities. The series had over 120 million copies in circulation by August 2023, making it one of the best-selling manga series in history, and it has spawned a media franchise including one-shot manga, light novels, and video games. The manga, TV anime, and live-action film are licensed in North America by Viz Media, which has produced various English-language releases of the series since 2005.

== Plot ==
The universe of JoJo's Bizarre Adventure is a reflection of the real world with the added existence of supernatural forces and beings. In this setting, some people are capable of transforming their inner spiritual power into a Stand (スタンド, Sutando), which are psycho-spiritual manifestations of a person's fighting spirit; another significant form of energy is Hamon (波紋; "Ripple"), a martial arts technique that allows its user to focus bodily energy into sunlight via controlled breathing. The narrative of JoJo's Bizarre Adventure is split into nine parts with independent stories and different characters. Each of the series' protagonists is a member of the Joestar family, whose mainline descendants possess a star-shaped birthmark above their left shoulder blade and a name that can be abbreviated to the titular "JoJo". (Note: The suke (助) in the Japanese name Josuke Higashikata can be read in the on'yomi form as "Jo", and the Italian name Giorno Giovanna is abbreviated as "GioGio", which is pronounced (/dʒodʒo/).) The first six parts take place within a single continuity whose generational conflict stems from the rivalry between Jonathan Joestar and Dio Brando, while the latter three parts take place in a second continuity where the Joestar family tree is heavily altered.

Part 1
Phantom Blood (ファントムブラッド, Fantomu Buraddo)
Volumes 1–5, 44 chapters. In late 19th-century England, Jonathan Joestar, the young son of a wealthy landowner, meets his new adopted brother, Dio Brando, who loathes him and plans to usurp Jonathan's position as heir to the Joestar family. When Dio's attempts are thwarted, he transforms himself into a vampire using an ancient Stone Mask and destroys the Joestar estate. Jonathan embarks on a journey, meets new allies, and masters the Hamon (波紋; "Ripple") martial arts technique to stop Dio, who has made world domination his new goal.
Part 2
Battle Tendency (戦闘潮流, Sentō Chōryū)
Volumes 5–12, 69 chapters. In 1938, German researchers discover three lifeforms called Pillar Men, powerful humanoids responsible for the creation of the Stone Mask. The Pillar Men awaken and escape in search of the Red Stone of Aja, which will turn them into invincible superbeings. Joseph Joestar, Jonathan's grandson, unites with new allies and masters Hamon to defeat the Pillar Men and their leader, Kars.
Part 3
Stardust Crusaders (スターダストクルセイダース, Sutādasuto Kuruseidāsu)
Volumes 13–28, 152 chapters. In 1989, Dio Brando (now referred to as simply "DIO") awakens after his coffin is salvaged from the ocean. Because Dio had taken over Jonathan's body, Stands awaken in Jonathan's descendants, including Joseph, his daughter Holly Kujo, and his grandson Jotaro Kujo. Holly, however, is unable to control her own Stand, which begins to slowly kill her. Jotaro, Joseph, and their allies set out to defeat Dio before Holly's Stand takes her life, fighting off Dio's henchmen along the way.
Part 4
Diamond Is Unbreakable (ダイヤモンドは砕けない, Daiyamondo wa Kudakenai)
Volumes 29–47, 174 chapters. In 1999, the Joestar family learns that Joseph has an illegitimate son, Josuke Higashikata, who lives in the fictional Japanese town of Morioh. While visiting Morioh, Jotaro learns of a mystical Bow and Arrow that bestows Stands upon those struck by it. As they hunt down the Bow and Arrow, Josuke, Jotaro, and their allies are targeted by Stand-using serial killer Yoshikage Kira and his father, Yoshihiro, who see them as a threat to the former's peace and tranquility.
Part 5
Golden Wind (黄金の風, Ōgon no Kaze)
Volumes 47–63, 155 chapters. Set in Naples, Italy, in 2001, Giorno Giovanna, who was conceived when Dio was in possession of Jonathan Joestar's body, seeks to become a mafia boss in order to eliminate drug dealers who sell their wares to children. Finding a powerful ally named Bruno Bucciarati, their team rebels against the boss of the mafia to protect his daughter, Trish Una, whom he intends to kill in order to hide his identity.
Part 6
Stone Ocean (ストーンオーシャン, Sutōn Ōshan)
Volumes 64–80, 158 chapters. In 2011, near Port St. Lucie, Florida, Jotaro Kujo's daughter Jolyne Cujoh is framed for murder and sent to prison. She works together with various allies to hunt down the person responsible for her framing: prison chaplain Enrico Pucci, a loyalist to Dio who seeks the creation of a new universe shaped to the late vampire's will.
Part 7
Steel Ball Run (スティール・ボール・ラン, Sutīru Bōru Ran)
Volumes 81–104, 95 chapters. In 1890, United States President Funny Valentine holds a cross-country horse race with a $50 million reward for the winner. Valentine secretly intends to use the race to gather the scattered parts of a holy corpse for his own nationalistic ends. Racers Gyro Zeppeli and Johnny Joestar uncover Valentine's ploy, and must defend themselves from both other racers and hired assassins.
Part 8
JoJolion (ジョジョリオン, Jojorion)
Volumes 105–131, 110 chapters. In 2011, the town of Morioh is devastated by the 2011 Tōhoku earthquake and tsunami. Local college student Yasuho Hirose discovers an amnesiac young man buried in the rubble. She nicknames him "Josuke" and puts him in the care of the Higashikata family. As Josuke tries to uncover the secret of his past, he is also confronted by a local crime syndicate of inhuman beings dubbed Rock Humans, whose leader, Toru, seeks to use the mysterious Locacaca fruit to rise to the apex of society.
Part 9
The JoJoLands
Volume 132 onwards. In early 2020s Hawaii, Jodio Joestar and his older brother (Note: Attributed to multiple sources:) Dragona work together in illegal activity to provide for and protect their mother. Working for their high school principal Meryl Mei Qi, the two are joined by the kleptomaniac Paco Laburantes and habitual drug user Usagi Alohaoe on a mission to steal a diamond from a rich Japanese tourist. The mission is derailed when the group discovers the Lava Rock, which has the ability to attract anything of value that its user touches, and they decide to use it to acquire $50 billion in assets from the Howler Company.

== Production ==
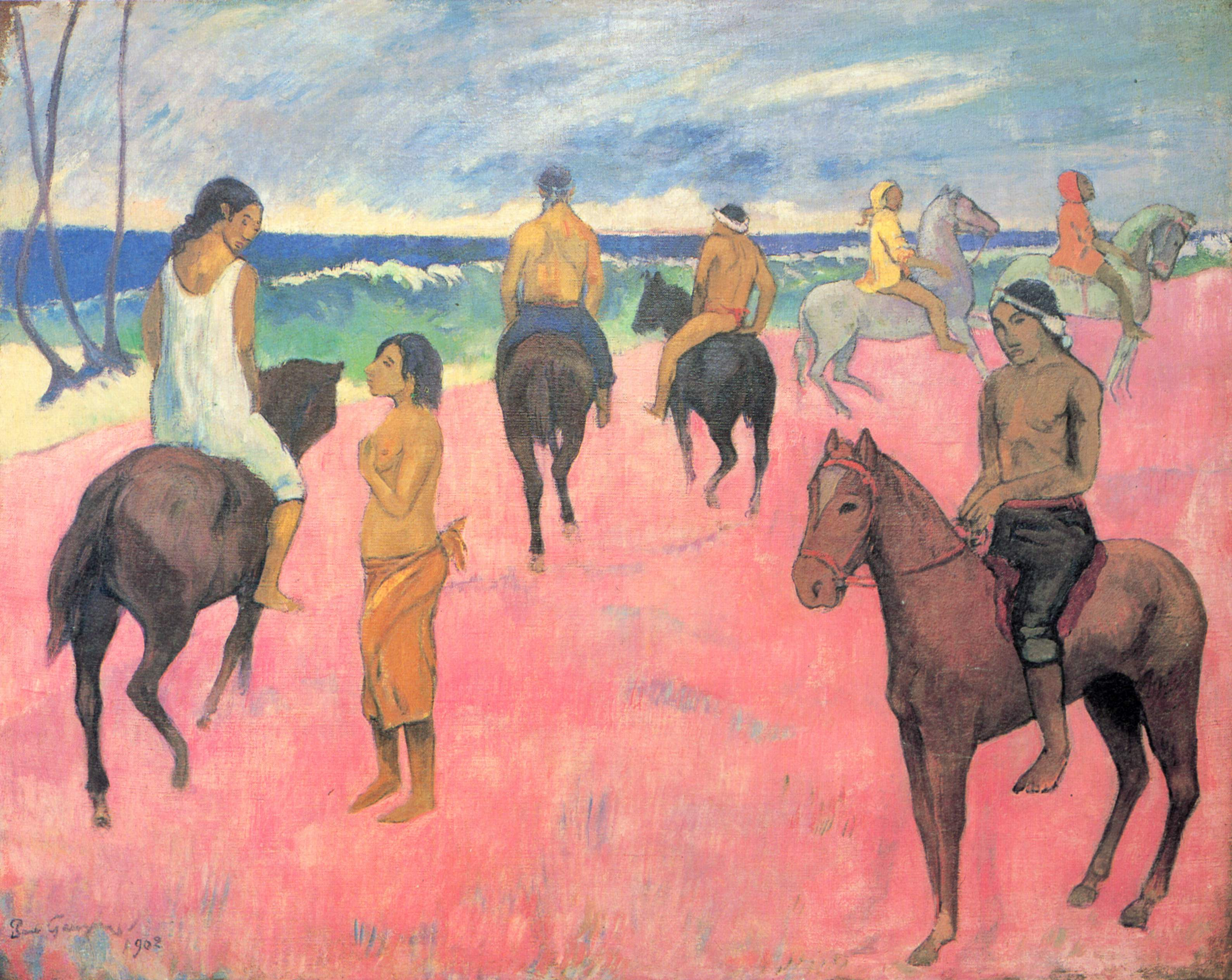
Araki was inspired by Western art, such as this piece by Paul Gauguin, to use unusual colors in his own art.

For JoJo's Bizarre Adventure, Araki wanted to use a classical method as a base before introducing modern elements. As an example, he often draws in a realistic style but uses surreal colors. Araki aimed to draw real spirits in JoJo, resulting in him going to the Kappa River in Tōno, Iwate, to get a better understanding of the concept. Araki was inspired by the art of the 1980s, shading techniques in Western art, and classical paintings; the manga coloring is based on calculations rather than consistency, with Araki citing artists like Paul Gauguin as inspiration. He also claimed that mystery is the central theme of the manga, as he was fascinated by the concept of it as a child. Furthermore, Araki wanted to explore superpowers and energy in JoJo's Bizarre Adventure, resulting in various concepts such as Hamon and Stands. He said that the supernatural basis of the fights in his series evened the battlefield for women and children to match up against physically strong men. Much like Araki's previous work and JoJo's spiritual predecessor, Baoh: The Visitor, the idea of an ultimate being was used in Phantom Blood and Battle Tendency in the forms of the vampires and the Pillar Men, respectively. For Stardust Crusaders in particular, Araki was influenced by role-playing games in designing the characters' skills. This part marked the transition from physical power to an emphasis on mental and spiritual power, with Araki noting that the idea of Stands came from the idea of drawing the heart and soul.

In creating the manga's generational story, Araki thought much about death, particularly the death of his grandfather, and the legacy people leave behind in their lives for their descendants. He also took inspiration from Roots: The Saga of an American Family and East of Eden. Araki focused on Roots for its family-centric story, and he took the idea of intertwined destiny and rivalry between two families from East of Eden. He thought highly of stories that were well-received after changing protagonists, which influenced Araki's decision to kill off Jonathan Joestar and write a generational story, passing on his "Spirit" to his own descendants.

None of the characters were modeled after anyone, except Jotaro Kujo, who was based on Clint Eastwood. Araki stated that he wanted to try a different type of main character for every part; for example, Part 1's Jonathan Joestar was a serious and honest person, whereas Part 2's Joseph Joestar was a trickster. Although their personalities are different, the two share a physical resemblance in order to have some continuity because it was unheard of in the 1980s for a main character to die in a Weekly Shōnen Jump series. Araki's consistent focus on the Joestar family was intended to give a feeling of pride, as well as wonder and mystery surrounding the lineage.

Araki originally planned the series as a trilogy, with the final confrontation taking place in present-day Japan. However, Araki did not want Part 3 to be a tournament affair, which was popular in Weekly Shōnen Jump at the time, and therefore decided to make it a "road movie" inspired by Around the World in Eighty Days. With Part 4, Araki said that he moved away from "muscle men", as they fell out of popularity with readers and he wanted to focus more on fashion. When designing his characters' outfits, Araki considers both everyday fashion and "cartoonish, bizarre clothing that would be impractical in real life". For Part 6, Araki wrote a female protagonist for the first time which he found complicated, but also interesting due to the humanity she could possess. He later described Part 2's much earlier supporting character Lisa Lisa as fresh and "unheard of" in both manga and society in general for its time, and said it was exciting to challenge people's expectations with the female warrior-type. Having not specifically set out on creating a disabled character, Araki explained that Part 7's paraplegic Johnny Joestar was a natural result of wanting to show a character who could grow, both physically and mentally, during a race where "he would be forced not only to rely on other people, but horses as well."

Araki frequently uses unique onomatopoeia and poses in the series, which he attributes to his love for heavy metal and horror films. The poses, known in Japanese as JoJo-dachi (ジョジョ立ち, lit. 'JoJo standing'), are considered iconic on his book covers and panels, and were inspired by Araki's trip to Italy in his 20s and his studies of Michelangelo's sculptures.

== Media ==
=== Manga ===
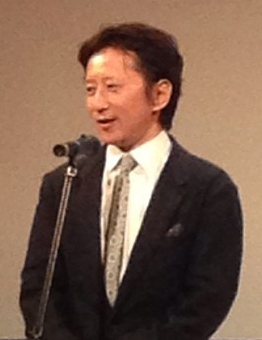
Hirohiko Araki, the author of JoJo's Bizarre Adventure

Written and illustrated by Hirohiko Araki, JoJo's Bizarre Adventure began serialization in the weekly shōnen manga anthology Weekly Shōnen Jump's combined issue #1–2 of 1987, published by Shueisha on January 1, 1987. The series is divided into nine story arcs, each following the adventures of a new protagonist bearing the "JoJo" nickname. The first part, titled Phantom Blood, was serialized until October 1987 and collected in five tankōbon volumes; the second, Battle Tendency, was serialized from November 1987 to March 1989 and collected in seven volumes. Stardust Crusaders, the third part, was serialized from March 1989 to April 1992 and collected in 16 volumes. Diamond Is Unbreakable, the fourth part, was serialized from April 1992 to November 1995 and collected in 18 volumes; it was followed by the fifth part, Golden Wind, which was serialized from November 1995 to April 1999 and collected in 17 volumes.

After volume 63 (the last volume of Golden Wind), the tankōbon numbering for each subsequent part restarts from one. Stone Ocean, the sixth part, was serialized from December 1999 to April 2003 and collected in 17 volumes. The first 23 chapters of the seventh part, Steel Ball Run, were serialized in Weekly Shōnen Jump from January to October 2004; in March 2005, the series was transferred to the monthly seinen manga magazine Ultra Jump. It ran until April 2011, and was collected in 24 volumes. JoJolion, the eighth part, was serialized from May 2011 to August 2021 and collected in 27 volumes. In the September 2021 issue of Ultra Jump, Araki stated in the author's notes that part 9 of the series, tentatively titled "JoJoLands" and later finalized as The JoJoLands, would begin on February 19, 2023, following a short break.

Between 2002 and 2009, the first six parts in the series were re-released by Shueisha in bunkoban format; Steel Ball Run was re-released in the format in 2017 and 2018. A sōshūhen omnibus series recreating the first four parts as they originally appeared in Weekly Shōnen Jump (including color pages, promotional text, and next chapter previews) was published between 2012 and 2016. Since 2012, all eight parts in the series have been digitally colored and distributed by Shueisha for smartphones and tablet computers under the brand name "JOJO-D". A premium hardcover release of the first three parts was published under the brand "JoJonium" between 2013 and 2015.

In the early 1990s, Viz Media reportedly had plans for an English-language release of JoJo's Bizarre Adventure in North America as The Strange Adventures of Jojo; in 2002, the series was unsuccessfully considered for release in the form of monthly comic books. Between November 2005 and December 2010, Viz published Stardust Crusaders, the most well-known part in the series, in 16 volumes. However, the company changed the names of several characters and Stands due to legal concerns and censored certain scenes, including scenes of violence against animals redrawn by Araki himself. In 2013, Viz expressed further interest in localizing the series, but explained its difficulties in doing so due to Araki's numerous references to real musicians and fashion designers. Viz began publishing the JoJonium release of Phantom Blood digitally in September 2014, with a three-volume hardcover print edition following throughout 2015. Battle Tendency was published in four volumes in 2015 and 2016, and Stardust Crusaders was published in ten volumes from 2016 to 2019. Viz continues to publish the series in their own digital and hardcover editions that emulate the JoJonium edition; Diamond Is Unbreakable was published in nine volumes from 2019 to 2021, while Golden Wind began in August 2021. In January 2022, Viz Media began releasing Stone Ocean digitally. Steel Ball Run is set be published in print starting in 2025.

==== Spin-offs ====
===== One-shots =====
Araki has also authored several manga spin-offs of JoJo's Bizarre Adventure, the first of which being "Episode 16: At a Confessional", which was published as a one-shot in Weekly Shōnen Jump in July 1997. It follows Rohan Kishibe from Diamond Is Unbreakable, and is the first entry in the Thus Spoke Rohan Kishibe series.

Dead Man's Questions (Note: デッドマンズQ, Deddomanzu Kuesuchonzu) follows Yoshikage Kira from the same part; it was published as three chapters in the magazine Allman in June and July 1999. Both one-shots were later published in Under Execution, Under Jailbreak, (Note: 死刑執行中脱獄進行中, Shikei Shikkōchū Datsugoku Shinkōchū) a collection of short story manga by Araki that was published in 1999. "Oingo Boingo Brothers Adventure", (Note: オインゴとボインゴ兄弟大冒険, Oingo to Boingo Kyōdai Daibōken) a one-shot featuring the title characters from Stardust Crusaders, was released on October 18, 2002. It is drawn in the style of Boingo's Stand Tohth, a fortune-telling comic book.

Between January 2008 and February 2018, six chapters of Thus Spoke Rohan Kishibe were published in various magazines. A tankōbon volume was published by Shueisha in November 2013, collecting the stories "At a Confessional", "Mutsu-kabe Hill", "Millionaire Village", "Poaching Seashore", and "Rohan Kishibe Goes to Gucci". "The Harvest Moon" was published digitally in September 2014 during the debut of Shueisha's Shōnen Jump+ website; a second tankōbon volume collecting the episode and the stories "A Rainy Monday", "D·N·A", and "The Run" was published in July 2018.

===== Shining Diamond's Demonic Heartbreak =====
In the September 2021 issue of Ultra Jump, it was announced that JoJo's Bizarre Adventure would be receiving a spin-off manga written by Kouhei Kadono and illustrated by No Guns Life author Tasuku Karasuma. The spin-off manga, Shining Diamond's Demonic Heartbreak, began publication in the January 2022 issue of Ultra Jump released on December 18, 2021. The spin-off stars Hol Horse and Josuke Higashikata in Morioh and takes place between the events of Stardust Crusaders and Diamond is Unbreakable.

===== I Testamenti Cremisi =====
Spin-off material based on Golden Wind has also been created, such as I Testamenti Cremisi, 'The Crimson Testaments', an anthology of short stories revolving around various antagonistic characters within the part, most notably the Hitman Team. "There's No Love Like a Parent's" (Note: 親の心子知らずの巻, Oya no Kokoroko Shirazu no Maki) features Ghiaccio and Melone taking care of the latter's Stand, Baby Face, who is going through a rebellious phase while its User is supposed to assassinate a film director. It was published in the Winter 2023 issue of the JoJo Magazine on December 19, 2023. "My Prized Needle and Thread" (Note: オレ自慢の針と糸, Ore Jiman no Hari to Ito) focuses on Prosciutto and Pesci, two hitmen tasked with assassinating a gangster who manages a brothel and drug trades without Passione's approval. The short story was published in the Winter 2024 issue of the JoJo magazine on December 18, 2024.

=== Anime ===
==== Studio A.P.P.P. ====
A 13-episode original video animation adaptation of Part 3, Stardust Crusaders, was produced by A.P.P.P. The first set of six episodes, which begin during the middle of the arc, were released by Pony Canyon on VHS and Laserdisc from 1993 to 1994. The series was released by Klock Worx on DVD and VHS from 2000 to 2002, starting with seven newly produced prequel episodes adapting the beginning of the arc. Super Techno Arts produced an English-language dub of all thirteen episodes in North America as a six-volume DVD series between 2003 and 2005, with the episodes also arranged in chronological order. A.P.P.P. also produced JoJo's Bizarre Adventure: Phantom Blood, a feature film adaptation of the manga's first arc; it was released theatrically in Japan on February 17, 2007.

==== David Production ====
At a July 2012 press conference celebrating the 25th anniversary of the series, Araki announced that an anime adaptation of JoJo's Bizarre Adventure was in production and would premiere in October 2012. The 26-episode first season, which covers the Phantom Blood and Battle Tendency arcs, aired weekly on Tokyo MX between October 2012 and April 2013. Although teased in the post-credit scenes of the finale, a second season adapting Stardust Crusaders was officially announced in October 2013. It aired on Tokyo MX in two halves; the first from April to September 2014, and the second from January to June 2015, for a total of 48 episodes. At an event for the anime in October 2015, a third season adapting Diamond Is Unbreakable was announced. It premiered in April 2016 and ended in December 2016, for a total of 39 episodes. A fourth season of the anime adapting Golden Wind was announced at an Araki art exhibition in June 2018. The first episode debuted at Anime Expo in July, and the season aired in 39 episodes from October 2018 to July 2019 on Tokyo MX. At a special event for the anime series on April 4, 2021, an adaptation of Stone Ocean was announced. Unlike the previous seasons, it debuted its first part worldwide on Netflix in December 2021, before receiving a Japanese television broadcast in January 2022. The second part premiered on Netflix in September 2022, and the third and final part premiered in December of that same year. An anime adaptation of Steel Ball Run premiered worldwide on Netflix in March 2026.

An original video animation (OVA) based on the "Millionaire Village" episode of the Thus Spoke Rohan Kishibe spin-off manga was distributed in 2017 to those who purchased every DVD or Blu-ray volume of Diamond Is Unbreakable. A second OVA adapting the "Mutsu-kabe Hill" episode was released with a special edition of the manga's second volume in July 2018. Two more OVA episodes adapting the "At a Confessional" and "The Run" episodes were screened in Japanese theaters in December 2019 and released on DVD and Blu-ray in March 2020.

With the 2014 premiere of Stardust Crusaders, American-based website Crunchyroll began streaming the anime series for viewers outside Japan one hour after the episodes aired. Warner Bros. Home Entertainment, who holds the DVD rights to the series, released the first season of the anime in September 2015, with an included English dub. In July 2016, Viz Media announced it acquired the Blu-ray rights to the series; it released the first three seasons with dubs between August 2017 and January 2020. In October 2016, American cable block Adult Swim began airing the anime on its Toonami block.

=== Other media ===
==== Drama CDs ====
From 1992 to 1993, a drama CD adaptation of Part 3 was released in three volumes, titled JoJo's Bizarre Adventure Volume 1: Jotaro Kujo's Visitation, (Note: ジョジョの奇妙な冒険第1巻 空条承太郎見参の巻, JoJo no Kimyō na Bōken Dai 1-kan Kūjō Jōtarō Kenzan no Maki) JoJo's Bizarre Adventure Volume 2: The Death of Avdol, (Note: ジョジョの奇妙な冒険第2巻 アヴドゥル死すの巻, JoJo no Kimyō na Bōken Dai 2-kan Avuduru Shisu no Maki) and JoJo's Bizarre Adventure Volume 3: Dio's World. (Note: ジョジョの奇妙な冒険第3巻 DIOの世界の巻, JoJo no Kimyō na Bōken Dai 3-kan Dio no Sekai no Maki) They starred Kiyoyuki Yanada as Jotaro, Kenji Utsumi (volumes 1 & 3) and Gorō Naya (volume 2) as Joseph Joestar, Akio Ōtsuka as Avdol, Shō Hayami as Kakyoin, Ken Yamaguchi as Polnareff, Keiichi Nanba as Hol Horse, Shigeru Chiba as J. Geil, and Norio Wakamoto as Dio.

A drama CD adaptation of Part 4 was released from 2016 to 2017 in two parts. The first was titled A Ghost Story from Budogaoka High (Note: ぶどうヶ丘高校の怪談, Budō Gaoka Kōkō no Kaidan) and the second After-school Talk: At Cafe Deux Magots.. (Note: 放課後トーク カフェ ドゥ・メゴにて, Hōkago Tōku Kafe Du Mego nite)

==== Video games ====
Several video games based on JoJo's Bizarre Adventure have been released. A titular role-playing video game based on Part 3 was released for the Super Famicom in 1993, and several fighting games have been released, including JoJo's Bizarre Adventure: Heritage for the Future in 1998, JoJo's Bizarre Adventure: All Star Battle for the series' 25th anniversary in 2013, and JoJo's Bizarre Adventure: Eyes of Heaven in 2015. Characters from the series have also been featured in various Weekly Shōnen Jump cross-over games, such as Jump Force, J-Stars Victory VS, Jump Ultimate Stars, Famicom Jump: Hero Retsuden, and its sequel, Famicom Jump II: Saikyō no Shichinin.

==== Light novels ====
Several light novels based on the manga have been written, each by a different author, but all including illustrations by Araki. The first novel, written by Mayori Sekijima and Hiroshi Yamaguchi, was based on Part 3 and titled JoJo's Bizarre Adventure, and it was released on November 4, 1993. Le Bizzarre Avventure di GioGio II: Golden Heart/Golden Ring, (Note: ジョジョの奇妙な冒険 II ゴールデンハート/ゴールデンリング, JoJo no Kimyō na Bōken Tsū Gōruden Hāto/Gōruden Ringu) written by Gichi Ōtsuka and Miya Shōtarō and based on Part 5, was released on May 28, 2001. Both novels received Italian translations; the first was released in 2003 with the subtitle The Genesis of Universe, and the second in 2004. In 2000, it was announced that the Japanese writer Otsuichi was writing a novel based on Part 4, which proved difficult to complete; in Kono Mystery ga Sugoi! 2005, Otsuichi claimed to have written over 2000 pages, which he later discarded. His work, The Book: JoJo's Bizarre Adventure 4th Another Day, was released on November 26, 2007. In April 2011, it was announced that Nisio Isin, Kouhei Kadono, and Ōtarō Maijō were each writing light novels in celebration of the series' 25th anniversary. Kadono's, titled Purple Smoke Distortion, (Note: 恥知らずのパープルヘイズ, Hajishirazu no Pāpuru Heizu) was released on September 16, 2011, and based on Part 5. Nisio's, titled JoJo's Bizarre Adventure Over Heaven, was released on December 16, 2011, and based on Part 3. Maijō's novel, Jorge Joestar, was released on September 19, 2012. It features characters from and inspired by nearly every part of the series.

==== Art books ====
Araki has released several books containing original artwork he has produced for JoJo's Bizarre Adventure. JoJo6251 was released on December 10, 1993, and features artwork, story details, and behind the scenes information for Parts 1 through 4. It was followed by JoJo A-Go! Go! on February 25, 2000, which features original artwork focusing on Parts 3 to 5. On September 19, 2013, he released JoJoveller, a multimedia set that includes a book featuring original artwork for Parts 6 through 8, a book detailing the history of the publications, and a book detailing every Stand featured since Stardust Crusaders.

==== Live-action film ====
In 2016, it was announced that Toho and Warner Bros. were partnering to produce a live-action film based on Diamond Is Unbreakable. The film was directed by Takashi Miike, stars Kento Yamazaki as Josuke, and was released in Japan on August 4, 2017. Both studios were planning for worldwide distribution and hoped to create sequels.

== Reception ==
=== Sales ===
JoJo's Bizarre Adventure had over 100 million copies in circulation by December 2016, and over 120 million copies in circulation by August 2023. making it one of the best-selling manga series of all time. The first volume of JoJolion was the second best-selling manga for its debut week; its second volume reached third place, and its third reached second place. All three volumes were some of the best-selling manga of 2012. All three volumes of Viz Media's release of Phantom Blood and all four volumes of Battle Tendency reached the top seven positions on The New York Times Manga Best Seller list. According to ICv2, JoJo's Bizarre Adventure was the eighth best-selling manga franchise of the Q4 2021 period (September–December) in the United States.

=== Critical reception ===
Reviewing the first volume, IGN named JoJo's Bizarre Adventure a "must read", declaring the artwork of "a standard virtually unseen in most manga produced today." Otaku USA's Joseph Luster called the series "fun as hell" and noted how the beginning is not filled with action like most Weekly Shōnen Jump series, but instead has the tension of horror and thriller films. Rebecca Silverman of Anime News Network wrote that the first volume "combines a fighting story with a solid emotional background, and will absolutely put hair on your chest." She called Dio an excellent villain that the readers can enjoy hating, but she criticized the anatomy of characters, saying "bodies are often twisted into impossible positions." Comics & Gaming Magazine's Cole Watson also strongly praised Dio as the highlight character of Part 1, stating that his eyes were glued to the page whenever he appeared, and described him as "the literal embodiment of Satan in manga form." Watson gave Phantom Blood a 7.5 out of 10, writing that while there is a lot to enjoy, it primarily serves as Dio's origin story and there are some moments that are "agonizingly slow".

Silverman described Part 2 as "less urgent" than Part 1, which allows for more humor and insanity, while still letting the reader get attached to the characters. She felt positively about how strikingly different the protagonist Joseph is from Part 1's Jonathan. However, she wrote that Araki's art had gotten even more "physically improbable", making it difficult to distinguish body parts. When discussing his views on having characters die in a series, writer Gen Urobuchi cited Battle Tendency's Caesar Zeppeli as a character who became "immortal" thanks to his death.

Reviewing Stardust Crusaders, Silverman enjoyed seeing Part 2's Joseph team up with the new protagonist, Jotaro Kujo, and was impressed that Araki was able to keep Dio out of Part 2 completely, only to bring him back for Part 3. She initially called the replacement of Hamon with Stands both understandable and a bit of a disappointment, since the "insane physical abilities and contortions" caused by the former were a large source of the fun in the first two parts. Silverman later described Stand battles as exciting and creative in subsequent reviews.

Anime News Network had both Silverman and Faye Hopper review the first volume of Part 4. Silverman called the beginning slower and not as instantly engrossing as the previous parts, but felt this allowed Josuke, whom she and Hopper both described as kinder than the previous protagonists, to develop as a character. Hopper stated that Diamond Is Unbreakable is sometimes criticized for a "lack of a strong narrative throughline" in comparison to other parts, but argued that this is one of its greatest strengths, as it allows the main characters to "simply be, lending them an amiable humanity that none of the over-the-top archetypes in the first 3 Parts ever had."

Both Screen Rant's Steven Blackburn and Jordan Richards of AIPT Comics called Golden Wind a breath of fresh air for JoJo's Bizarre Adventure by deviating from the basic formula and following Giorno, son of villain Dio Brando, as he looks to cement a reputation and build a criminal empire. Mary Lee Sauder of Anime News Network complimented the series' alternating narratives, and cited Part 5 as an example of how Araki avoids tropes commonly found in shōnen manga. Jenni Lada of Siliconera also praised the protagonist Giorno and said the first volume of Part 5 shows how skilled Araki is at getting people quickly invested in a character and story. She wrote that by giving readers a look at Giorno's past and insights into the person he became, it emphasized why he was compelling; "We're introduced to his dream and see him take his first steps toward it." Despite calling the supporting cast a memorable bunch, Richards felt they were underdeveloped as of the first volume, but noted they had potential.

Heidi Kemps, also of Otaku USA, was mostly positive in her review of "Rohan at the Louvre", praising the art for being drawn in full-color by hand, although noted that readers new to JoJo's Bizarre Adventure might not fully understand the ending due to the one-shot only briefly explaining the ability of Rohan's Stand, Heaven's Door.

=== Accolades ===
For the 10th anniversary of the Japan Media Arts Festival in 2006, Japanese fans voted JoJo's Bizarre Adventure second on a list of the Top 10 Manga of all time. The series ranked tenth in a 2009 survey by Oricon on what manga series people wanted to see receive a live-action adaptation of. The 2013 edition of Kono Manga ga Sugoi!, which surveys people in the manga and publishing industry, named JoJolion the twelfth best manga series for male readers. JoJolion won the grand prize for manga at the 2013 Japan Media Arts Festival. In November 2014, readers of Da Vinci magazine voted JoJo's Bizarre Adventure as the fifth greatest Weekly Shōnen Jump manga series of all time. On TV Asahi's Manga Sōsenkyo 2021 poll, in which 150,000 people voted for their top 100 manga series, JoJo's Bizarre Adventure ranked tenth.

=== Controversy ===
In May 2008, both Shueisha and studio A.P.P.P. halted manga and OVA shipments of JoJo's Bizarre Adventure after a complaint had been launched against them from anonymous online Egyptian Islamic fundamentalists, who noticed a scene in the Stardust Crusaders OVA in which Dio Brando reads a book depicting pages from the Quran while he orders a mercenary, Hol Horse, to kill the protagonists. According to Japan Today and Islamist Watch, some Muslims feared this scene could spark a backlash not seen since the Jyllands-Posten Muhammad cartoons controversy. Sheikh Abdul Hamid Attrash, chairman of the Fatwa Committee at Al-Azhar, claimed that the scene depicted Muslims as terrorists and that Shueisha would be considered enemies of Islam. This recall affected the English-language releases as well, causing Viz Media and Shueisha to cease publication for a year. Even though the manga did not feature that specific scene, Shueisha had Araki redraw scenes that depicted characters fighting on top of, and destroying, mosques for later printings of the series. The Japanese Ministry of Foreign Affairs addressed the issue in an official report about this incident, stating that Shueisha and A.P.P.P. had no blasphemic intentions.

Viz resumed publication a year later, with the eleventh volume being published on April 7, 2009, but distribution of the OVA was permanently discontinued. Jason Thompson later included Shueisha's changes to the manga in a list of "The Greatest Censorship Fails" in manga.

== Legacy and collaborations ==
The September 2007 issue of Cell had a cover drawn by Hirohiko Araki with a ligase represented as a JoJo's Bizarre Adventure Stand. He also contributed artwork towards the restoration of Chūson-ji following the 2011 Tōhoku earthquake and tsunami. Araki contributed JoJo-inspired art for Sayuri Ishikawa's 2012 album X -Cross-, where she performs one of the series' iconic poses and is drawn wearing jewelry from the manga. JoJo-style artwork has also been produced for other works, such as a 2008 collection featuring Yasunari Kawabata's short story "The Dancing Girl of Izu" and a 2012 reprint of Tamaki Saitō's Lacan for Surviving.

In 2009, Araki was one of five artists featured in the Louvre's Le Louvre invite la bande dessinée ("The Louvre Invites Comic-Strip Art") exhibition for his artwork of JoJo's Bizarre Adventure. To commemorate this honor, he wrote "Rohan au Louvre", (Note: 岸辺露伴 ルーヴルへ行く, Kishibe Rohan Rūvuru e Iku; lit. 'Rohan Goes to the Louvre') a 123-page full color story starring Rohan Kishibe visiting the Louvre and discovering a cursed painting tied to his family. The following year it was published in France and ran in Ultra Jump, and in February 2012 was translated and released in North America by NBM Publishing.

From July 19 to August 18, 2019, the Tower Records store in Shibuya held an exhibit celebrating the finale of the fifth part of the series, Golden Wind, and to promote the release of two games, JoJo's Pitter Patter Pop! and JoJo's Bizarre Adventure: Last Survivor. The exhibit showed various concept art pieces from the series' artists, as well as scripts from the show. Visitors could receive free items such as stickers, folders, and cards upon completion of various tasks, such as answering a quiz or buying a certain amount of items. Each floor of the Tower Records building had a character on display, as a cardboard cutout and on the elevator doors. On August 14, 2019, a panel was held with directors Hideya Takahashi and Yasuhiro Kimura, and producer Kasama.

Several video game characters, such as Street Fighter's Guile and Tekken's Paul Phoenix, were inspired by JoJo's Polnareff. When they discovered a new species of Neostygarctus in 2013, scientists Shinta Fujimoto and Katsumi Miyazaki named it Neostygarctus lovedeluxe after a Stand from Diamond Is Unbreakable. The song "Don't Bite the Dust" by heavy metal band Lovebites was influenced by and named after a Stand from Diamond Is Unbreakable.

=== Gucci ===
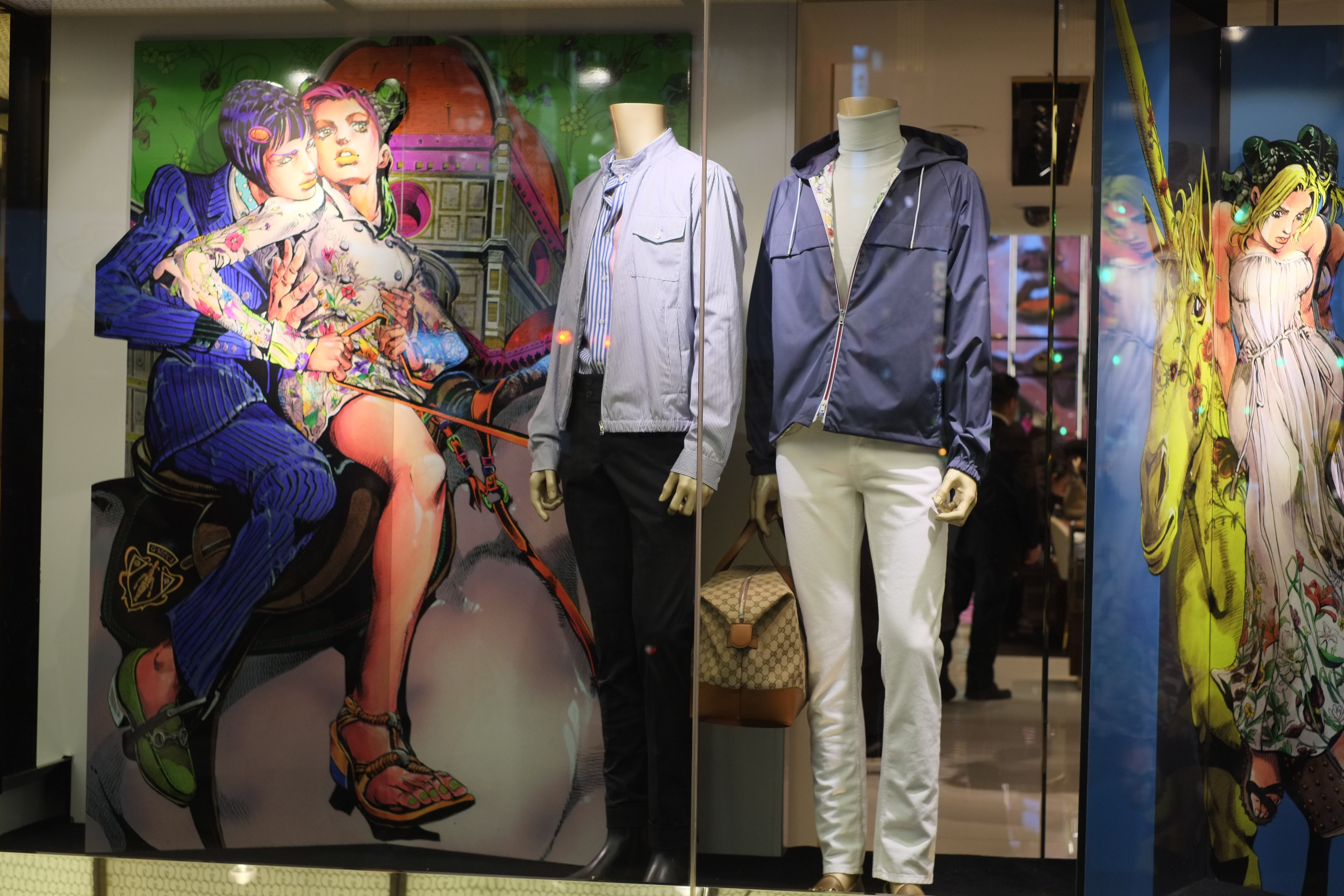
A Gucci store display in 2013, featuring JoJo's Bizarre Adventure characters Bruno Bucciarati and Jolyne Cujoh

From September 17 to October 6, 2011, the Gucci store in Shinjuku hosted the Gucci x Hirohiko Araki x Spur "Rohan Kishibe Goes to Gucci" Exhibition, a collaboration between the luxury Italian clothing brand, Araki, and the Japanese fashion magazine Spur. (Note: シュプール, Shupūru) The exhibit celebrated the 90th anniversary of Gucci and featured a life-size figure of Rohan Kishibe, as well as numerous illustrations by Araki that included actual pieces of the brand's own 2011–2012 fall/winter collection and his own original fashion designs. The October 2011 issue of Spur featured another one-shot manga titled "Rohan Kishibe Meets Gucci", (Note: 岸辺露伴 グッチへ行く, Kishibe Rohan Guchi e Iku; lit. 'Rohan Kishibe Goes to Gucci') in which Rohan goes to a Gucci factory to discover the secret behind a magical handbag with the characters wearing and using Gucci products. This was followed by another collaboration in the February 2013 issue of Spur with "Jolyne, Fly High with Gucci", (Note: 徐倫、GUCCIで飛ぶ, Jorīn, Gutchi de Tobu) starring Jolyne Cujoh from Part 6. A free English translation of the latter was previously available on Gucci's Facebook page. Again, Araki's artwork was featured in Gucci's storefront displays around the world.

=== 25th anniversary ===
There were numerous art exhibitions in 2012 in Japan for the manga's 25th anniversary. The first was in Sendai, Araki's birthplace, where a Lawson store was remodeled to resemble the "Owson" store that appears in Diamond Is Unbreakable and JoJolion. The store was open from July 28 to September 30, and contained exclusive goods with the Owson name. The second exhibition was held in Tokyo from October 6 to November 4, and hangouts were held on Google Plus to allow fans to view the gallery at night through the lens of Remote Romance, (Note: リモートロマンス, Rimōto Romansu) an original "Stand" Araki and his team created for the event. The exhibit was taken to Italy from June 28 to July 14, 2013, and shown at the Gucci showroom in Florence.

The October 2012 issue of Ultra Jump contained a special booklet titled 25 Years With JoJo that also celebrated the anniversary; it featured messages and tribute art from well known manga artists such as Akira Toriyama, Yoshihiro Togashi, Eiichiro Oda, Clamp, and 18 others. During the 25th anniversary celebrations, a special smartphone with a JoJo's Bizarre Adventure-inspired UI was released.

To celebrate the release of the All Star Battle video game created for the 25th anniversary, a special JoJo-themed train traveled the Yamanote Line in Tokyo from August 29 to September 9, 2013. Illustrations and advertisements of the series littered the interior, with videos of the game shown on displays, while the exterior had 33 characters as livery. (Note: Noun, third definition)
