= Darlene Brannigan Smith =

Interim president of Frostburg State University
- Incumbent
- Assumed office March 10, 2025
- Preceded by: Ronald Nowaczyk

Personal details
- Children: 2
- Education: University of Baltimore; University of Maryland, College Park

Darlene Brannigan Smith is an American academic administrator and marketing professor serving as the interim president of Frostburg State University since 2025. She was provost of University of Baltimore from 2016 to 2025.

== Education ==
Darlene Brannigan Smith began her undergraduate studies at a community college before transferring to the University of Baltimore (UB), where she earned a B.S. She completed a M.B.A. from UB in 1980. Smith earned a Ph.D. at the University of Maryland, College Park.

== Career ==
Smith began her academic career in 1986 as an instructor at George Washington University. She later served as an assistant professor of marketing at the university from 1988 to 1994. Afterward, she joined Loyola College as an assistant professor of marketing, a position she held until 2005. During her time at Loyola, she became the academic director of executive and graduate business programs in 2001.

In 2005, Smith moved to the University of Baltimore (UB), where she was appointed associate dean of graduate and executive programs at the Robert G. Merrick School of Business. She was later promoted to associate dean in 2007 before becoming dean of the business school in July 2008. During her tenure as dean, she worked on restructuring education programs to align with employer needs and increasing online course offerings.

On January 20, 2016, Smith was appointed executive vice president and provost of UB, assuming the role of chief academic officer responsible for academic affairs. She also worked in the University System of Maryland as interim associate vice chancellor for academic programs and special assistant to the senior vice chancellor for academic affairs.

On March 10, 2025, Smith became interim president of Frostburg State University (FSU). She was appointed following the death of former president Ronald Nowaczyk.

== Personal life ==
Smith is married and has two daughters.
